= Artin's theorem on induced characters =

In group representation theory, a branch of mathematics, Artin's theorem on induced characters, introduced by E. Artin, states that a character on a finite group is a rational linear combination of characters induced from all cyclic subgroups of the group.

There is a similar but in some sense more precise theorem due to Brauer, which says that the theorem remains true if "rational" and "cyclic subgroup" are replaced with "integer" and "elementary subgroup".

== Statement ==
In Linear Representation of Finite Groups Serre states in Chapter 9.2, 17 the theorem in the following, more general way:

Let $G$ be a finite group and $X$ any family of subgroups.

Then the following are equivalent:

1. $G$ is the union of conjugates of the subgroups in $X$: $G = \bigcup_{g\in G, H \in X} g^{-1}Hg$
2. for every character $\chi$ of $G$ there exist characters $\chi_H$ of $H$ for each $H \in X$ and $n \in \N$ such that $n \chi = \sum_{H\in X} \text{Ind}_H^G(\chi_H)$

This in turn implies Artin's original statement, by choosing $X$ to be the set of all cyclic subgroups of $G$.

== Proof ==
Let $G$ be a finite group and $(\chi_i)$ its irreducible characters. Recall the representation ring $\mathcal{R}(G)$ is the free abelian group on the set $\{\chi_i\}$. Since all of $G$'s characters are linear combinations of $(\chi_i)$ with nonnegative integer coefficients, every element of $\mathcal{R}(G)$ is the difference of two characters of $G$. Moreover, because the product of two characters is also a character, $\mathcal{R}(G)$ is a ring. It is a sub-ring of the $\mathbb{C}$-algebra of class functions on $G$. This algebra is isomorphic to $\mathbb{C}\otimes\mathcal{R}(G)$, and has $(\chi_i)$ as a basis.

Both the operation $\text{Res}$ of restricting a representation of $G$ to one of its subgroups $H$ and the adjoint operation $\text{Ind}$ of inducing representations from $H$ to $G$ give abelian group homomorphisms:

$\begin{array}{cccl} \text{Res} \colon & \mathcal{R}(G) &\to& \mathcal{R}(H) \\ & \sum k_i\chi_i &\mapsto& \sum k_i \text{Res}_H^G \chi_i \end{array}$

$\begin{array}{cccl} \text{Ind} \colon & \mathcal{R}(H) &\to& \,\mathcal{R}(G) \\ & \sum k_i\chi_i &\mapsto& \sum k_i \text{Ind}_H^G \chi_i \end{array}$

where $\text{Res}$ is actually a ring homomorphism.

With these notations, the theorem can be equivalently rewritten as follows. If $X$ is a family of subgroups of $G$, the following properties are equivalent:

1. $G$ is the union of the conjugates of the subgroups in $X$
2. The cokernel of $\text{Ind} \colon \bigoplus_{H\in X}\mathcal{R}(H) \to \mathcal{R}(G)$ is finite.

We start with the following lemma:

Lemma. Let $H$ be an element of $X$. We claim that for every $f\in\mathcal{R}(H)$, $\text{Ind}(f)$ vanishes on $g\in G$ if $g$ is not conjugate to any $h \in H$.

Proof. It is enough to prove this lemma for the character $\phi$ of a representation $\theta \colon H\to \mathrm{GL}(W)$, since any $f \in\mathcal{R}(H)$ is a difference of two such characters. So, let $\rho \colon G\to \mathrm{GL}(V)$ be the representation of $G$ induced from the representation $\theta$ of $H$, and let $(r_i)$ be a set of representatives of the cosets of $H$ in $G$, which are the points of $G/H$. By definition of induced representation, $V$ is the direct sum of its subspaces $\rho(r_i) W$, and the linear transformation $\rho(g)$ permutes these subspaces, since

$$\rho(g) \circ \rho(r_i)W=\rho(g r_i) W=\rho(r_{i'})W$$

where $g r_i=r_{i'}h$ for some $h\in H$. To show that $\text{Ind}(\phi)(g)=\text{tr}_V(\rho(g))$ vanishes, we now choose a basis for $V$ that is a union of the bases of the subspaces $\rho(r_i)W$. In this basis for $V$, the diagonal matrix entry of $\rho(g)$ vanishes for each basis vector in $\rho(r_i)W$ with $r_i\neq r_{i'}$. But $r_i=r_{i'}$ would imply $r_i^{-1} g r_i = h \in H$, which is ruled out by our assumption that $g$ is not conjugate to any element of $H$. Thus, all the diagonal matrix entries of $\rho(g)$ vanish, so $\text{tr}_V(\rho_g)=0$ as desired, proving the lemma. ■

Now we prove 2. $\implies$ 1. The lemma implies that all elements in the image of $\text{Ind} \colon \bigoplus_{H\in X}\mathcal{R}(H) \to \mathcal{R}(G)$ vanish on every $g \in G$ in

$$S:= G - \bigcup_{g\in G, H \in X} g^{-1}Hg$$,

The same therefore holds for all elements in the image of the $\mathbb{C}$-linear map

$$\mathbb{C}\otimes \text{Ind} \colon \mathbb{C}\otimes\bigoplus_{H\in X}\mathcal{R}(H) \to \mathbb{C}\otimes\mathcal{R}(G)$$

On the other hand, this map is surjective, because otherwise $\text{Ind}$ would have an infinite cokernel, contradicting assumption 2. Thus, every element of $\mathbb{C}\otimes\mathcal{R}(G)$ vanishes on $S$, insuring $S= \emptyset$, so that every element of $G$ is conjugate to an element of some subgroup $H \in X$, as was to be shown.

Let us now prove 1. $\implies$ 2. First, note that it is enough to show 1. implies that $\mathbb{C}\otimes \text{Ind}\colon \mathbb{C}\otimes\bigoplus_{H\in X}\mathcal{R}(H) \to \mathbb{C}\otimes\mathcal{R}(G)$ is surjective. Indeed, this surjectivity implies that $\mathbb{C}\otimes\mathcal{R}(G)$ has a basis $(e_i)$ composed of elements of the image $A$ of $\text{Ind}$. Since this basis must have the same cardinality $n$ as $(\chi_i)$, the quotient $\mathcal{R}(G)/A$ is isomorphic to some quotient $\mathbb{Z}^n/\prod_i^n H_i\cong \prod_i^n\mathbb{Z}/H_i$ where the $H_i$ are non-trivial ideals of $\mathbb{Z}$, and this quotient is clearly finite, giving 2.

By duality, proving the surjectivity of $\mathbb{C}\otimes \text{Ind}$ is equivalent to proving the injectivity of

$$\mathbb{C}\otimes \text{Res}\colon \mathbb{C}\otimes\mathcal{R}(G) \to \mathbb{C}\otimes\bigoplus_{H\in X}\mathcal{R}(H).$$

However, this is clearly true, because it is equivalent to saying that if a character vanishes on every conjugacy class of $G$ it vanishes, which holds because characters are constant on each conjugacy class.

This concludes the proof of the theorem.
