= History of representation theory =

The history of representation theory concerns the mathematical development of the study of objects in abstract algebra, notably groups, by describing these objects more concretely, particularly using matrices and linear algebra. In some ways, representation theory predates the mathematical objects it studies: for example, permutation groups (in algebra) and transformation groups (in geometry) were studied long before the notion of an abstract group was formalized by Arthur Cayley in 1854. Thus, in the history of algebra, there was a process in which, first, mathematical objects were abstracted, and then the more abstract algebraic objects were realized or represented in terms of the more concrete ones, using homomorphisms, actions and modules.

An early pioneer of the representation theory of finite groups was Ferdinand Georg Frobenius. At first this method was not widely appreciated, but with the development of character theory and the proof of Burnside's $p^\alpha q^\beta$ solvability criterion using such methods, its power was soon appreciated. Later Richard Brauer and others developed modular representation theory.
