= Induced character =

In mathematics, an induced character is the character of the representation V of a finite group G induced from a representation W of a subgroup H ≤ G. More generally, there is also a notion of the induction of a class function f on H, $\operatorname{Ind}(f)$, given by the formula

$$\operatorname{Ind}(f)(s) = \frac{1}{|H|} \sum_{t \in G,\  t^{-1} st \in H} f(t^{-1} st).$$

If f is a character of the representation W of H, then this formula for $\operatorname{Ind}(f)$ calculates the character of the induced representation V of G.

The basic result on induced characters is Brauer's theorem on induced characters. It states that every irreducible character on G is a linear combination with integer coefficients of characters induced from elementary subgroups.
