= Frobenius reciprocity =

Duality between the process of restricting and inducting in representation theory

In mathematics, and in particular representation theory, Frobenius reciprocity is a theorem expressing a duality between the process of restricting and inducing. It can be used to leverage knowledge about representations of a subgroup to find and classify representations of "large" groups that contain them. It is named for Ferdinand Georg Frobenius, the inventor of the representation theory of finite groups.

== Statement ==
=== Character theory ===
The theorem was originally stated in terms of character theory. Let G be a finite group with a subgroup H, let $\operatorname{Res}_H^G$ denote the restriction of a character, or more generally, class function of G to H, and let $\operatorname{Ind}_H^G$ denote the induced class function of a given class function on H. For any finite group A, there is an inner product $\langle -,-\rangle_A$ on the vector space of class functions $A\to\mathbb{C}$ (described in detail in the article Schur orthogonality relations). Now, for any class functions $\psi:H\to\mathbb{C}$ and $\varphi:G\to\mathbb{C}$, the following equality holds:

$$\langle\operatorname{Ind}_H^G\psi, \varphi\rangle_G=\langle\psi,\operatorname{Res}_H^G\varphi\rangle_H.$$

In other words, $\operatorname{Ind}_H^G$ and $\operatorname{Res}_H^G$ are Hermitian adjoint.

Proof of Frobenius reciprocity for class functions

Let $\psi:H\to\mathbb{C}$ and $\varphi:G\to\mathbb{C}$ be class functions.

Proof. Every class function can be written as a linear combination of irreducible characters. As $\langle\cdot,\cdot\rangle$ is a bilinear form, we can, without loss of generality, assume $\psi$ and $\varphi$ to be characters of irreducible representations of $H$ in $W$ and of $G$ in $V,$ respectively. We define $\psi(s)=0$ for all $s\in G\setminus H.$ Then we have

$$\begin{align}
\langle \text{Ind}(\psi), \varphi\rangle_G &= \frac{1}{|G|} \sum_{t\in G} \text{Ind}(\psi)(t) \varphi(t^{-1}) \\
&= \frac{1}{|G|} \sum_{t\in G} \frac{1}{|H|}\sum_{s\in G \atop s^{-1}ts \in H} \psi(s^{-1}ts) \varphi(t^{-1}) \\
&= \frac{1}{|G|} \frac{1}{|H|}\sum_{t\in G} \sum_{s\in G} \psi(s^{-1}ts) \varphi((s^{-1}ts)^{-1}) \\
&= \frac{1}{|G|} \frac{1}{|H|}\sum_{t\in G} \sum_{s\in G} \psi(t) \varphi(t^{-1})\\
&= \frac{1}{|H|}\sum_{t\in G} \psi(t) \varphi(t^{-1})\\
&= \frac{1}{|H|}\sum_{t\in H} \psi(t) \varphi(t^{-1})\\
&= \frac{1}{|H|}\sum_{t\in H} \psi(t) \text{Res}(\varphi)(t^{-1})\\
&= \langle \psi, \text{Res}(\varphi)\rangle_H
\end{align}$$

In the course of this sequence of equations we used only the definition of induction on class functions and the properties of characters. $\Box$

Alternative proof. In terms of the group algebra, i.e. by the alternative description of the induced representation, the Frobenius reciprocity is a special case of a general equation for a change of rings:

$$\text{Hom}_{\Complex [H]}(W,U)=\text{Hom}_{\Complex [G]}(\Complex [G]\otimes_{\Complex [H]}W, U).$$

Taking the dimension of both sides, we obtain

$$\langle W,\text{Res}(U)\rangle_H=\langle W,U\rangle_H=\langle \text{Ind}(W),U\rangle_G.$$

As this bilinear form tallies the bilinear form on the corresponding characters, the theorem follows without calculation. $\Box$

=== Module theory ===
As explained in the section Representation theory of finite groups#Representations, modules and the convolution algebra, the theory of the representations of a group G over a field K is, in a certain sense, equivalent to the theory of modules over the group algebra K[G]. Therefore, there is a corresponding Frobenius reciprocity theorem for K[G]-modules.

Let G be a group with subgroup H, let M be an H-module, and let N be a G-module. In the language of module theory, the induced module $K[G]\otimes_{K[H]} M$ corresponds to the induced representation $\operatorname{Ind}_H^G$, whereas the restriction of scalars ${_{K[H]}}N$ corresponds to the restriction $\operatorname{Res}_H^G$. Accordingly, the statement is as follows: The following sets of module homomorphisms are in bijective correspondence:

$$\operatorname{Hom}_{K[G]}(K[G]\otimes_{K[H]} M,N)\cong \operatorname{Hom}_{K[H]}(M,{_{K[H]}}N)$$.

As noted below in the section on category theory, this result applies to modules over all rings, not just modules over group algebras.

=== Category theory ===
Let G be a group with a subgroup H, and let $\operatorname{Res}_H^G,\operatorname{Ind}_H^G$ be defined as above. For any group A and field K let $\textbf{Rep}_A^K$ denote the category of linear representations of A over K. There is a forgetful functor

$$\begin{align}
\operatorname{Res}_H^G:\textbf{Rep}_G&\longrightarrow\textbf{Rep}_H \\
(V,\rho) &\longmapsto \operatorname{Res}_H^G(V,\rho)
\end{align}$$

This functor acts as the identity on morphisms. There is a functor going in the opposite direction:

$$\begin{align}
\operatorname{Ind}_H^G:\textbf{Rep}_H &\longrightarrow\textbf{Rep}_G \\
(W,\tau) &\longmapsto \operatorname{Ind}_H^G(W,\tau)
\end{align}$$

These functors form an adjoint pair $\operatorname{Ind}_H^G\dashv\operatorname{Res}_H^G$. In the case of finite groups, they are actually both left- and right-adjoint to one another. This adjunction gives rise to a universal property for the induced representation (for details, see Induced representation#Properties).

In the language of module theory, the corresponding adjunction is an instance of the more general relationship between restriction and extension of scalars.

== See also ==
- See Restricted representation and Induced representation for definitions of the processes to which this theorem applies.
- See Representation theory of finite groups for a broad overview of the subject of group representations.
- See Selberg trace formula and the Arthur-Selberg trace formula for generalizations to discrete cofinite subgroups of certain locally compact groups.
