= Burnside's theorem =

Mathematics, group theory

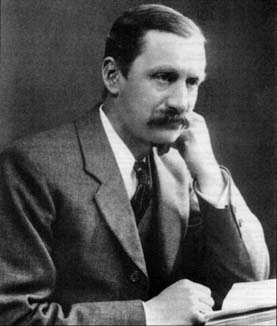
William Burnside.

In mathematics, Burnside's theorem in group theory states that if $G$ is a finite group of order $p^a q^b$ where $p$ and $q$ are prime numbers, and $a$ and $b$ are non-negative integers, then $G$ is solvable. Hence each non-Abelian finite simple group has order divisible by at least three distinct primes.

== History ==
The theorem was proved by William Burnside (1904) using the representation theory of finite groups. Several special cases of the theorem had previously been proved by Burnside in 1897, Jordan in 1898, and Frobenius in 1902. John G. Thompson pointed out that a proof avoiding the use of representation theory could be extracted from his work in the 1960s and 1970s on the N-group theorem, and this was done explicitly by Goldschmidt (1970) for groups of odd order, and by Bender (1972) for groups of even order. Matsuyama (1973) simplified the proofs.

== Proof ==
The following proof — using more background than Burnside's — is by contradiction. Let $p^a q^b$ be the smallest product of two prime powers, such that there is a non-solvable group $G$ whose order is equal to this number.

- $G$ is a simple group with trivial center and $a$ is not zero.

If $G$ had a nontrivial proper normal subgroup $H$, then (because of the minimality of $G$), $H$ and $G / H$ would be solvable, so $G$ as well, which would contradict our assumption. So $G$ is simple.

If $a$ were zero, $G$ would be a finite q-group, hence nilpotent, and therefore solvable.

Similarly, $G$ cannot be abelian, otherwise it would be solvable. As $G$ is simple, its center must therefore be trivial.

- There is an element $g$ of $G$ which has $q^d$ conjugates, for some $d > 0$.

By the first statement of Sylow's theorem, $G$ has a subgroup $S$ of order $p^a$. Because $S$ is a nontrivial $p$-group, its center $Z(S)$ is nontrivial. Fix a nontrivial element $g \in Z(S)$. The number of conjugates of $g$ is equal to the index of its centralizer $G_g$, which divides the index $q^b$ of $S$ (because $S$ is a subgroup of $G_g$). Hence this number is of the form $q^d$. Moreover, the integer $d$ is strictly positive, since $g$ is nontrivial and therefore not central in $G$.

- There exists a nontrivial irreducible representation $\rho$ with character $\chi$, such that its dimension $n$ is not divisible by $q$ and the complex number $\chi(g)$ is not zero.

Let $(\chi_i)_{1 \leq i \leq h}$ be the family of irreducible characters of $G$ over $\mathbb{C}$ (here $\chi_1$ denotes the trivial character). Because $g$ is not in the same conjugacy class as 1, the orthogonality relation for the columns of the group's character table gives:

$$0=\sum_{i=1}^h \chi_i(1)\chi_i(g)= 1 + \sum_{i=2}^h \chi_i(1)\chi_i(g).$$

Now the $\chi_i(g)$ are algebraic integers, because they are sums of roots of unity. If all the nontrivial irreducible characters which don't vanish at $g$ take a value divisible by $q$ at 1, we deduce that

$$-\frac1q=\sum_{i\ge 2,~\chi_i(g)\ne 0}\frac{\chi_i(1)}q\chi_i(g)$$

is an algebraic integer (since it is a sum of integer multiples of algebraic integers), which is absurd. This proves the statement.

- The complex number $q^d \chi(g) / n$ is an algebraic integer.

The set of integer-valued class functions on $G$, $Z(\Z[G])$, is a commutative ring, finitely generated over $\Z$. All of its elements are thus integral over $\Z$, in particular the mapping $u$ which takes the value 1 on the conjugacy class of $g$ and 0 elsewhere.

The mapping $A\colon Z(\Z[G]) \rightarrow \operatorname{End}(\Complex^n)$ which sends a class function $f$ to

$$\sum_{s\in G} f(s)\rho(s)$$

is a ring homomorphism. Because $\rho(s)^{-1} A(u) \rho(s) = A(u)$ for all $s$, Schur's lemma implies that $A(u)$ is a homothety $\lambda I_n$. Its trace $n \lambda$ is equal to

$$\sum_{s\in G} f(s)\chi(s)=q^d\chi(g).$$

Because the homothety $\lambda I_n$ is the homomorphic image of an integral element, this proves that the complex number $\lambda = q^d \chi(g) / n$ is an algebraic integer.

- The complex number $\chi(g) / n$ is an algebraic integer.

Since $q$ is relatively prime to $n$, by Bézout's identity there are two integers $x$ and $y$ such that:

$$xq^d + yn=1\quad\text{therefore}\quad \frac{\chi(g)}{n}=x\frac{q^d\chi(g)}{n} + y\chi(g).$$

Because a linear combination with integer coefficients of algebraic integers is again an algebraic integer, this proves the statement.

- The image of $g$, under the representation $\rho$, is a homothety.

Let $\zeta$ be the complex number $\chi(g) / n$. It is an algebraic integer, so its norm $N(\zeta)$ (i.e. the product of its conjugates, that is the roots of its minimal polynomial over $\Q$) is a nonzero integer. Now $\zeta$ is the average of roots of unity (the eigenvalues of $\rho(g)$), hence so are its conjugates, so they all have an absolute value less than or equal to 1. Because the absolute value of their product $N(\zeta)$ is greater than or equal to 1, their absolute value must all be 1, in particular $\zeta$, which means that the eigenvalues of $\rho(g)$ are all equal, so $\rho(g)$ is a homothety.

- Conclusion

Let $N$ be the kernel of $\rho$. The homothety $\rho(g)$ is central in $\operatorname{Im}(\rho)$ (which is canonically isomorphic to $G / N$), whereas $g$ is not central in $G$. Consequently, the normal subgroup $N$ of the simple group $G$ is nontrivial, hence it is equal to $G$, which contradicts the fact that $\rho$ is a nontrivial representation.

This contradiction proves the theorem.
