= Real element =

In mathematics, specifically group theory, an element $x$ of a group $G$ is called a real element of $G$ if it belongs to the same conjugacy class as its inverse $x^{-1}$; that is, if there is a $g$ in $G$ with $g^{-1}xg = x^{-1}$. The element $x$ is called strongly real if there is an involution $t$ with $x^t = x^{-1}$.

An element $x$ of a group $G$ is real if and only if for all representations $\rho$ of $G$, the trace $\mathrm{Tr}(\rho(g))$ of the corresponding matrix is a real number. In other words, an element $x$ of a group $G$ is real if and only if $\chi(x)$ is a real number for all characters $\chi$ of $G$.

A group with every element real is called an ambivalent group. Every ambivalent group has a real character table. The symmetric group $S_n$ of any degree $n$ is ambivalent.

== Properties ==
A group with real elements other than the identity element necessarily is of even order.

For a real element $x$ of a group $G$, the number of group elements $g$ with $g^{-1}xg = x^{-1}$ is equal to $|C_G(x)|$, where $C_G(x)$ is the centralizer of $x$:

$$C_G(x) = \{ g \in G\mid g^{-1}xg = x \}$$.

Every involution is strongly real. Furthermore, every element that is the product of two involutions is strongly real. Conversely, every strongly real element is the product of two involutions.

If $x \neq e$ is real in $G$ and $\left|C_G(x)\right|$ is odd, then $x$ is strongly real in $G$.

== Extended centralizer ==
The extended centralizer of an element $x$ of a group $G$ is defined as

$$C^*_G(x) = \{ g \in G\mid g^{-1}xg = x \lor g^{-1}xg = x^{-1} \}$$

making the extended centralizer of an element $x$ equal to the normalizer of the set $\{x, x^{-1}\}$.

The extended centralizer of an element of a group $G$ is always a subgroup of $G$. For involutions or non-real elements, the centralizer and extended centralizer are equal. For a real element $x$ that is not an involution,

$$\left|C^*_G(x):C_G(x)\right| = 2.$$

== See also ==
- Brauer–Fowler theorem
