= Brauer's theorem on induced characters =

Fundamental result in the branch of mathematics known as character theory

Brauer's theorem on induced characters, often known as Brauer's induction theorem, and named after Richard Brauer, is a basic result in the branch of mathematics known as character theory, which is part of the representation theory of finite groups.

== Background ==
A precursor to Brauer's induction theorem was Artin's induction theorem, which states that |G| times the trivial character of G is an integer combination of characters which are each induced from trivial characters of cyclic subgroups of G. Brauer's theorem removes the factor |G|, but at the expense of expanding the collection of subgroups used. Some years after the proof of Brauer's theorem appeared, J.A. Green showed (in 1955) that no such induction theorem (with integer combinations of characters induced from linear characters) could be proved with a collection of subgroups smaller than the Brauer elementary subgroups.

Another result between Artin's induction theorem and Brauer's induction theorem, also due to Brauer and also known as Brauer's theorem or Brauer's lemma is the fact that the regular representation of G can be written as $1+\sum\lambda_i\rho_i$ where the $\lambda_i$ are positive rationals and the $\rho_i$ are induced from characters of cyclic subgroups of G. Note that in Artin's theorem the characters are induced from the trivial character of the cyclic group, while here they are induced from arbitrary characters (in applications to Artin's L functions it is important that the groups are cyclic and hence all characters are linear giving that the corresponding L functions are analytic).

== Statement ==
Let G be a finite group and let Char(G) denote the subring of the ring of complex-valued class functions of G consisting of integer combinations of irreducible characters. Char(G) is known as the character ring of G, and its elements are known as virtual characters (alternatively, as generalized characters, or sometimes difference characters). It is a ring by virtue of the fact that the product of characters of G is again a character of G. Its multiplication is given by the elementwise product of class functions.

Brauer's induction theorem shows that the character ring can be generated (as an abelian group) by characters of representations induced from one-dimensional representations of subgroups of G.

In fact, Brauer showed that these subgroups could be chosen from a very restricted collection, now called elementary subgroups. By definition, a subgroup is elementary if it is a direct product of a cyclic group and a group whose order is a power of a prime.

== Proofs ==
The proof of Brauer's induction theorem exploits the ring structure of Char(G) (most proofs also make use of a slightly larger ring, Char*(G), which consists of $\mathbb{Z}[\omega]$-combinations of irreducible characters, where ω is a primitive complex |G|-th root of unity). The set of integer combinations of characters induced from linear characters of Brauer elementary subgroups is an ideal I(G) of Char(G), so the proof reduces to showing that the trivial character is in I(G). Several proofs of the theorem, beginning with a proof due to Brauer and John Tate, show that the trivial character is in the analogously defined ideal I*(G) of Char*(G) by concentrating attention on one prime p at a time, and constructing integer-valued elements of I*(G) which differ (elementwise) from the trivial character by (integer multiples of) a sufficiently high power of p. Once this is achieved for every prime divisor of |G|, some manipulations with congruences and algebraic integers, again exploiting the fact that I*(G) is an ideal of Char*(G), place the trivial character in I(G). An auxiliary result here is that a $\mathbb{Z}[\omega]$-valued class function lies in the ideal I*(G) if its values are all divisible (in $\mathbb{Z}[\omega]$) by |G|.

Brauer's induction theorem was proved in 1946, and there are now many alternative proofs. In 1986, Victor Snaith gave a proof by a radically different approach, topological in nature (an application of the Lefschetz fixed-point theorem). There has been related recent work on the question of finding natural and explicit forms of Brauer's theorem, notably by Robert Boltje.

== Applications ==
Using Frobenius reciprocity, Brauer's induction theorem leads easily to his fundamental characterization of characters, which asserts that a complex-valued class function of G is a virtual character if and only if its restriction to each Brauer elementary subgroup of G is a virtual character. This result, together with the fact that a virtual character θ is an irreducible character if and only if θ(1) > 0 and $\langle \theta,\theta \rangle =1$ (where $\langle,\rangle$ is the usual inner product on the ring of complex-valued class functions) gives a means of constructing irreducible characters without explicitly constructing the associated representations.

An initial motivation for Brauer's induction theorem was application to Artin L-functions. It shows that those are built up from Dirichlet L-functions, or more general Hecke L-functions. Highly significant for that application is whether each character of G is a non-negative integer combination of characters induced from linear characters of subgroups. In general, this is not the case. In fact, by a theorem of Taketa, if all characters of G are so expressible, then G must be a solvable group (although solvability alone does not guarantee such expressions—for example, the solvable group SL(2,3) has an irreducible complex character of degree 2 which is not expressible as a non-negative integer combination of characters induced from linear characters of subgroups). An ingredient of the proof of Brauer's induction theorem is that when G is a finite nilpotent group, every complex irreducible character of G is induced from a linear character of some subgroup.
