= Elementary group =

Direct product of a p-group and a cyclic group of coprime order

In algebra, more specifically group theory, a p-elementary group is a direct product of a finite cyclic group of order relatively prime to p and a p-group. A finite group is an elementary group if it is p-elementary for some prime number p. An elementary group is nilpotent.

Brauer's theorem on induced characters states that a character on a finite group is a linear combination with integer coefficients of characters induced from elementary subgroups.

More generally, a finite group G is called a p-hyperelementary if it has the extension

$$1 \longrightarrow C \longrightarrow G \longrightarrow P \longrightarrow 1$$

where $C$ is cyclic of order prime to p and P is a p-group. Not every hyperelementary group is elementary: for instance the non-abelian group of order 6 is 2-hyperelementary, but not 2-elementary.

== See also ==
- Elementary abelian group
