= Induced representation =

Process of extending a representation of a subgroup to the parent group

In group theory, the induced representation is a representation of a group, G, which is constructed using a known representation of a subgroup H. Given a representation of H, the induced representation is, in a sense, the "most general" representation of G that extends the given one. Since it is often easier to find representations of the smaller group H than of G, the operation of forming induced representations is an important tool to construct new representations.

Induced representations were initially defined by Frobenius, for linear representations of finite groups. The idea is by no means limited to the case of finite groups, but the theory in that case is particularly well-behaved.

== Constructions ==
=== Algebraic ===
Let G be a finite group and H any subgroup of G. Furthermore let (π, V) be a representation of H. Let n = [G : H] be the index of H in G and let g_{1}, ..., g_{n} be a full set of representatives in G of the left cosets in G/H. The induced representation Ind^{G}_{H} π can be thought of as acting on the following space:

$$W=\bigoplus_{i=1}^n g_i V.$$

Here each g_{i} V is an isomorphic copy of the vector space V whose elements are written as g_{i} v with v ∈ V. For each g in G there is an h_{i} in H for each i and a permutation j of {1, ..., n} such that g g_{i} = g_{j(i)} h_{i}, where h_{i} as well as j depend on g. This is just another way of saying that g_{1}, ..., g_{n} is a full set of representatives. Via the induced representation G acts on W as follows:

$$g\cdot\sum_{i=1}^n g_i v_i=\sum_{i=1}^n g_{j(i)} \pi(h_i) v_i$$

where $v_i \in V$ for each i.

Alternatively, one can construct induced representations by extension of scalars: any K-linear representation $\pi$ of the group H can be viewed as a module V over the group ring K[H]. We can then define

$$\operatorname{Ind}_H^G\pi= K[G]\otimes_{K[H]} V.$$

This latter formula can also be used to define Ind^{G}_{H} π for any group G and subgroup H, without requiring any finiteness.

==== Examples ====
For any group, the induced representation of the trivial representation of the trivial subgroup is the right regular representation. More generally the induced representation of the trivial representation of any subgroup is the permutation representation on the cosets of that subgroup.

An induced representation of a one-dimensional representation is called a monomial representation, because it can be represented as monomial matrices. Some groups have the property that all of their irreducible representations are monomial, the so-called monomial groups.

==== Properties ====
If H is a subgroup of the group G, then every K-linear representation ρ of G can be viewed as a K-linear representation of H; this is known as the restriction of ρ to H and denoted by Res(ρ). In the case of finite groups and finite-dimensional representations, the Frobenius reciprocity theorem states that, given representations σ of H and ρ of G, the space of H-equivariant linear maps from σ to Res(ρ) has the same dimension over K as that of G-equivariant linear maps from Ind(σ) to ρ.

The universal property of the induced representation, which is also valid for infinite groups, is equivalent to the adjunction asserted in the reciprocity theorem. If $(\sigma,V)$ is a representation of H and $(\operatorname{Ind}(\sigma),\hat{V})$ is the representation of G induced by $\sigma$, then there exists a H-equivariant linear map $j:V\to\hat{V}$ with the following property: given any representation (ρ,W) of G and H-equivariant linear map $f:V\to W$, there is a unique G-equivariant linear map $\hat{f}: \hat{V}\to W$ with $\hat{f}j=f$. In other words, $\hat{f}$ is the unique map making the following diagram commute:

The Frobenius formula states that if χ is the character of the representation σ, given by χ(h) = Tr σ(h), then the character ψ of the induced representation is given by

$$\psi(g) = \sum_{x\in G / H} \widehat{\chi}\left(x^{-1}gx \right),$$

where the sum is taken over a system of representatives of the left cosets of H in G and

$$\widehat{\chi} (k) = \begin{cases} \chi(k) & \text{if } k \in H \\ 0 & \text{otherwise}\end{cases}$$

=== Analytic ===
If G is a locally compact topological group (possibly infinite) and H is a closed subgroup then there is a common analytic construction of the induced representation. Let (π, V) be a continuous unitary representation of H into a Hilbert space V. We can then let:

$$\operatorname{Ind}_H^G\pi= \left\{\phi\colon G \to V \ : \ \phi(gh^{-1})=\pi(h)\phi(g)\text{ for all }h\in H,\; g\in G \text{ and } \ \phi \in L^2(G/H)\right\}.$$

Here φ∈L^{2}(G/H) means: the space G/H carries a suitable invariant measure, and since the norm of φ(g) is constant on each left coset of H, we can integrate the square of these norms over G/H and obtain a finite result. The group G acts on the induced representation space by translation, that is, (g.φ)(x)=φ(g^{−1}x) for g,x∈G and φ∈Ind^{G}_{H} π.

This construction is often modified in various ways to fit the applications needed. A common version is called normalized induction and usually uses the same notation. The definition of the representation space is as follows:

$$\operatorname{Ind}_H^G\pi= \left \{\phi \colon G \to V \ : \  \phi(gh^{-1})=\Delta_G^{-\frac{1}{2}}(h)\Delta_H^{\frac{1}{2}}(h)\pi(h)\phi(g)  \text{ and }  \phi\in L^2(G/H) \right \}.$$

Here Δ_{G}, Δ_{H} are the modular functions of G and H respectively. With the addition of the normalizing factors this induction functor takes unitary representations to unitary representations.

One other variation on induction is called compact induction. This is just standard induction restricted to functions with compact support. Formally it is denoted by ind and defined as:

$$\operatorname{ind}_H^G\pi= \left\{\phi\colon G \to V \ : \ \phi(gh^{-1})=\pi(h)\phi(g) \text{ and } \phi \text{ has compact support mod } H \right\}.$$

Note that if G/H is compact then Ind and ind are the same functor.

=== Geometric ===
Suppose G is a topological group and H is a closed subgroup of G. Also, suppose π is a representation of H over the vector space V. Then G acts on the product G × V as follows:

$$g.(g',x)=(gg',x)$$

where g and g′ are elements of G and x is an element of V.

Define on G × V the equivalence relation

$$(g,x) \sim (gh,\pi(h^{-1})(x)) \text{ for all }h\in H.$$

Denote the equivalence class of $(g,x)$ by $[g,x]$. Note that this equivalence relation is invariant under the action of G; consequently, G acts on (G × V)/~ . The latter is a vector bundle over the quotient space G/H with H as the structure group and V as the fiber. Let W be the space of sections $\phi : G/H \to (G \times V)/ \! \sim$ of this vector bundle. This is the vector space underlying the induced representation $\operatorname{Ind}_H^G\pi : W \to \mathcal L_W$. The group G acts on a section $\phi : G/H \to (G \times V)/ \! \sim$ given by $gH \mapsto [g,\phi_g]$ as follows:

$$(g\cdot \phi)(g'H)=[g',\phi_{g^{-1}g'}] \ \text{ for } g,g'\in G.$$

=== Systems of imprimitivity ===
In the case of unitary representations of locally compact groups, the induction construction can be formulated in terms of systems of imprimitivity.

== Lie theory ==
In Lie theory, an extremely important example is parabolic induction: inducing representations of a reductive group from representations of its parabolic subgroups. This leads, via the philosophy of cusp forms, to the Langlands program.

== See also ==
- Restricted representation
- Nonlinear realization
- Frobenius character formula
- Frobenius reciprocity, an important result that relates induced representations to restricted representations
