= Class function =

In mathematics, especially in the fields of group theory and representation theory of groups, a class function is a function on a group G that is constant on the conjugacy classes of G. In other words, it is invariant under the conjugation map on G. Such functions play a basic role in representation theory.

== Characters ==
The character of a linear representation of G over a field K is always a class function with values in K. The class functions form the center of the group ring K[G]. Here a class function f is identified with the element $\sum_{g \in G} f(g) g$.

== Inner products ==
The set of class functions of a group G with values in a field K form a K-vector space. If G is finite and the characteristic of the field does not divide the order of G, then there is an inner product defined on this space defined by $\langle \phi , \psi \rangle = \frac{1}{|G|} \sum_{g \in G} \phi(g) \overline{\psi(g)},$ where |G| denotes the order of G and the overbar denotes conjugation in the field K. The set of irreducible characters of G forms an orthogonal basis. Further, if K is a splitting field for G—for instance, if K is algebraically closed, then the irreducible characters form an orthonormal basis.

When G is a compact group and K = C is the field of complex numbers, the Haar measure can be applied to replace the finite sum above with an integral: $\langle \phi, \psi \rangle = \int_G \phi(t) \overline{\psi(t)}\, dt.$ In this setting, the irreducible characters form a Hilbert basis of the Hilbert space of square-integrable class functions, by the Peter–Weyl theorem.

When K is the real numbers or the complex numbers, the inner product is a non-degenerate Hermitian bilinear form.

== See also ==
- Brauer's theorem on induced characters
