= Viennot's geometric construction =

Mathematics concept

In mathematics, Viennot's geometric construction (named after Xavier Gérard Viennot) gives a diagrammatic interpretation of the Robinson–Schensted correspondence in terms of shadow lines. It has a generalization to the Robinson–Schensted–Knuth correspondence, which is known as the matrix-ball construction.

== The construction ==
Starting with a permutation $\sigma \in S_n$, written in two-line notation, say:

$$\sigma = \begin{pmatrix}
1 & 2 & \cdots & n \\
\sigma_1 & \sigma_2 & \cdots & \sigma_n
\end{pmatrix},$$

one can apply the Robinson–Schensted correspondence to this permutation, yielding two standard Young tableaux of the same shape, P and Q. P is obtained by performing a sequence of insertions, and Q is the recording tableau, indicating in which order the boxes were filled.

Viennot's construction starts by plotting the points $(i, \sigma_i)$ in the plane, and imagining there is a light that shines from the origin, casting shadows straight up and to the right. This allows consideration of the points which are not shadowed by any other point; the boundary of their shadows then forms the first shadow line. Removing these points and repeating the procedure, one obtains all the shadow lines for this permutation. Viennot's insight is that the top and right endpoints of these shadow lines read off the first rows of P and Q (in fact, even more than that; these shadow lines form a "timeline", indicating which elements formed the first rows of P and Q after the successive insertions). One can then repeat the construction, using as new points the inner corners of the previous shadow lines (corners away from the light source), which allows to read off the next row of P and Q.

== Animation ==
For example consider the permutation

$$\sigma = \begin{pmatrix}
1 & 2 & 3 & 4 & 5 & 6 & 7 & 8 \\
3 & 8 & 1 & 2 & 4 & 7 & 5 & 6
\end{pmatrix}.$$

Then Viennot's construction goes as follows:

== Applications ==
One can use Viennot's geometric construction to prove that if $\sigma$ corresponds to the pair of tableaux P,Q under the Robinson–Schensted correspondence, then $\sigma^{-1}$ corresponds to the switched pair Q,P. Indeed, taking $\sigma$ to $\sigma^{-1}$ reflects Viennot's construction in the $y=x$-axis, and this precisely switches the roles of P and Q.

== See also ==
- Plactic monoid
- Jeu de taquin
