= Littlewood–Richardson rule =

Mathematical rule

In mathematics, the Littlewood–Richardson rule is a combinatorial description of the coefficients that arise when decomposing a product of two Schur functions as a linear combination of other Schur functions. These coefficients are natural numbers, which the Littlewood–Richardson rule describes as counting certain skew tableaux. They occur in many other mathematical contexts, for instance as multiplicity in the decomposition of tensor products of finite-dimensional representations of general linear groups, or in the decomposition of certain induced representations in the representation theory of the symmetric group, or in the area of algebraic combinatorics dealing with Young tableaux and symmetric polynomials.

Littlewood–Richardson coefficients depend on three partitions, say $\lambda,\mu,\nu$, of which $\lambda$ and $\mu$ describe the Schur functions being multiplied, and $\nu$ gives the Schur function of which this is the coefficient in the linear combination; in other words they are the coefficients $c_{\lambda,\mu}^\nu$ such that

$$s_\lambda s_\mu=\sum_\nu c_{\lambda,\mu}^\nu s_\nu.$$

The Littlewood–Richardson rule states that $c_{\lambda,\mu}^\nu$ is equal to the number of Littlewood–Richardson tableaux of skew shape $\nu/\lambda$ and of weight $\mu$.

== History ==
Unfortunately the Littlewood–Richardson rule is much harder to prove than was at first suspected. The author was once told that the Littlewood–Richardson rule helped to get men on the moon but was not proved until after they got there.

— Gordon James (1987)

The Littlewood–Richardson rule was first stated by D. E. Littlewood and A. R. Richardson (1934, theorem III p. 119) but though they claimed it as a theorem they only proved it in some fairly simple special cases. Robinson (1938) claimed to complete their proof, but his argument had gaps, though it was so obscurely written that these gaps were not noticed for some time, and his argument is reproduced in the book (Littlewood 1950). Some of the gaps were later filled by Macdonald (1995). The first rigorous proofs of the rule were given four decades after it was found, by Schützenberger (1977) and Thomas (1974), after the necessary combinatorial theory was developed by C. Schensted (1961), Schützenberger (1963), and Knuth (1970) in their work on the Robinson–Schensted correspondence. There are now several short proofs of the rule, such as (Gasharov 1998), and (Stembridge 2002) using Bender-Knuth involutions. Littelmann (1994) used the Littelmann path model to generalize the Littlewood–Richardson rule to other semisimple Lie groups.

The Littlewood–Richardson rule is notorious for the number of errors that appeared prior to its complete, published proof. Several published attempts to prove it are incomplete, and it is particularly difficult to avoid errors when doing hand calculations with it: even the original example in D. E. Littlewood and A. R. Richardson (1934) contains an error.

=== Littlewood–Richardson tableaux ===
A Littlewood–Richardson tableau

A Littlewood–Richardson tableau is a skew semistandard tableau with the additional property that the sequence obtained by concatenating its reversed rows is a lattice word (or lattice permutation), which means that in every initial part of the sequence any number $i$ occurs at least as often as the number $i+1$. Another equivalent (though not quite obviously so) characterization is that the tableau itself, and any tableau obtained from it by removing some number of its leftmost columns, has a weakly decreasing weight. Many other combinatorial notions have been found that turn out to be in bijection with Littlewood–Richardson tableaux, and can therefore also be used to define the Littlewood–Richardson coefficients.

Another Littlewood–Richardson tableau

=== Example ===
Consider the case that $\lambda=(2,1)$, $\mu=(3,2,1)$ and $\nu=(4,3,2)$. Then the fact that $c_{\lambda,\mu}^\nu=2$ can be deduced from the fact that the two tableaux shown at the right are the only two Littlewood–Richardson tableaux of shape $\nu/\lambda$ and weight $\mu$. Indeed, since the last box on the first nonempty line of the skew diagram can only contain an entry 1, the entire first line must be filled with entries 1 (this is true for any Littlewood–Richardson tableau); in the last box of the second row we can only place a 2 by column strictness and the fact that our lattice word cannot contain any larger entry before it contains a 2. For the first box of the second row we can now either use a 1 or a 2. Once that entry is chosen, the third row must contain the remaining entries to make the weight (3,2,1), in a weakly increasing order, so we have no choice left any more; in both case it turns out that we do find a Littlewood–Richardson tableau.

=== A more geometrical description ===
The condition that the sequence of entries read from the tableau in a somewhat peculiar order form a lattice word can be replaced by a more local and geometrical condition. Since in a semistandard tableau equal entries never occur in the same column, one can number the copies of any value from right to left, which is their order of occurrence in the sequence that should be a lattice word. Call the number so associated to each entry its index, and write an entry i with index j as i[j]. Now if some Littlewood–Richardson tableau contains an entry $i>1$ with index j, then that entry i[j] should occur in a row strictly below that of $(i-1)[j]$ (which certainly also occurs, since the entry i − 1 occurs as least as often as the entry i does). In fact the entry i[j] should also occur in a column no further to the right than that same entry $(i-1)[j]$ (which at first sight appears to be a stricter condition). If the weight of the Littlewood–Richardson tableau is fixed beforehand, then one can form a fixed collection of indexed entries, and if these are placed in a way respecting those geometric restrictions, in addition to those of semistandard tableaux and the condition that indexed copies of the same entries should respect right-to-left ordering of the indexes, then the resulting tableaux are guaranteed to be Littlewood–Richardson tableaux.

== An algorithmic form of the rule ==
The Littlewood–Richardson as stated above gives a combinatorial expression for individual Littlewood–Richardson coefficients, but gives no indication of a practical method to enumerate the Littlewood–Richardson tableaux in order to find the values of these coefficients. Indeed, for given $\lambda,\mu,\nu$ there is no simple criterion to determine whether any Littlewood–Richardson tableaux of shape $\nu/\lambda$ and of weight $\mu$ exist at all (although there are a number of necessary conditions, the simplest of which is $|\lambda|+|\mu|=|\nu|$); therefore it seems inevitable that in some cases one has to go through an elaborate search, only to find that no solutions exist.

Nevertheless, the rule leads to a quite efficient procedure to determine the full decomposition of a product of Schur functions, in other words to determine all coefficients $c_{\lambda,\mu}^\nu$ for fixed λ and μ, but varying ν. This fixes the weight of the Littlewood–Richardson tableaux to be constructed and the "inner part" λ of their shape, but leaves the "outer part" ν free. Since the weight is known, the set of indexed entries in the geometric description is fixed. Now for successive indexed entries, all possible positions allowed by the geometric restrictions can be tried in a backtracking search. The entries can be tried in increasing order, while among equal entries they can be tried by decreasing index. The latter point is the key to efficiency of the search procedure: the entry i[j] is then restricted to be in a column to the right of $i[j+1]$, but no further to the right than $i-1[j]$ (if such entries are present). This strongly restricts the set of possible positions, but always leaves at least one valid position for $i[j]$; thus every placement of an entry will give rise to at least one complete Littlewood–Richardson tableau, and the search tree contains no dead ends.

A similar method can be used to find all coefficients $c_{\lambda,\mu}^\nu$ for fixed λ and ν, but varying μ.

== Littlewood–Richardson coefficients ==
The Littlewood–Richardson coefficients c^{ν}_{λμ} appear in the following interrelated ways:

- They are the structure constants for the product in the ring of symmetric functions with respect to the basis of Schur functions

$$s_\lambda s_\mu =\sum c_{\lambda\mu}^\nu s_\nu$$

or equivalently c^{ν}_{λμ} is the inner product of s_{ν} and s_{λ}s_{μ}.

- They express skew Schur functions in terms of Schur functions

$$s_{\nu/\lambda} =\sum _\mu c_{\lambda\mu}^\nu s_\mu.$$

- The c^{ν}_{λμ} appear as intersection numbers on a Grassmannian:

$$\sigma_\lambda \sigma_\mu =\sum c_{\lambda\mu}^\nu \sigma_\nu$$

where σ_{μ} is the class of the Schubert variety of a Grassmannian corresponding to μ.

- c^{ν}_{λμ} is the number of times the irreducible representation V_{λ} ⊗ V_{μ} of the product of symmetric groups S_{|λ|} × S_{|μ|} appears in the restriction of the representation V_{ν} of S_{|ν|} to S_{|λ|} × S_{|μ|}. By Frobenius reciprocity this is also the number of times that V_{ν} occurs in the representation of S_{|ν|} induced from V_{λ} ⊗ V_{μ}.
- The c^{ν}_{λμ} appear in the decomposition of the tensor product (Fulton 1997) of two Schur modules (irreducible representations of special linear groups)

$$E^\lambda \otimes E^\mu =\bigoplus_\nu (E^\nu)^{\oplus c_{\lambda\mu}^\nu}.$$

- c^{ν}_{λμ} is the number of standard Young tableaux of shape ν/μ that are jeu de taquin equivalent to some fixed standard Young tableau of shape λ.
- c^{ν}_{λμ} is the number of Littlewood–Richardson tableaux of shape ν/λ and of weight μ.
- c^{ν}_{λμ} is the number of pictures between μ and ν/λ.

== Special cases ==
=== Pieri's formula ===
Pieri's formula, which is the special case of the Littlewood–Richardson rule in the case when one of the partitions has only one part, states that

$$S_\mu S_n=\sum_\lambda S_\lambda$$

where S_{n} is the Schur function of a partition with one row and the sum is over all partitions λ obtained from μ by adding n elements to its Ferrers diagram, no two in the same column.

=== Rectangular partitions ===
If both partitions are rectangular in shape, the sum is also multiplicity free (Okada 1998). Fix a, b, p, and q positive integers with p $\geq$ q. Denote by $(a^p)$ the partition with p parts of length a. The partitions indexing nontrivial components of $s_{(a^p)}s_{(b^q)}$ are those partitions $\lambda$ with length $\leq p+q$ such that

- $\lambda_{q+1} = \lambda_{q+2} = \cdots = \lambda_p = a,$
- $\lambda_q \geq \mathrm{max}(a,b)$
- $\lambda_i + \lambda_{p+q - i + 1} = a+b, \quad {i = 1, \dots, q}.$

For example,

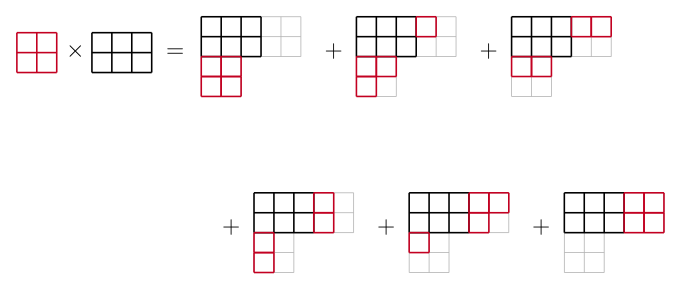

.

== Generalizations ==
=== Reduced Kronecker coefficients of the symmetric group ===
The reduced Kronecker coefficient of the symmetric group $\bar{C}_{\lambda,\mu,\nu}$ is a generalization of $c_{\lambda,\mu}^\nu$ to three arbitrary Young diagrams $\lambda,\mu,\nu$, which is symmetric under permutations of the three diagrams.

=== Skew Schur functions ===
Zelevinsky (1981) extended the Littlewood–Richardson rule to skew Schur functions as follows:

$$s_\lambda s_{\mu/\nu} = \sum_{\lambda+\omega(T_{\ge j})\in P}s_{\lambda+\omega(T)}$$

where the sum is over all tableaux T on μ/ν such that for all j, the sequence of integers λ+ω(T_{≥j}) is non-increasing, and ω is the weight.

=== Newell-Littlewood numbers ===
Newell-Littlewood numbers are defined from Littlewood–Richardson coefficients by the cubic expression

$$N_{\mu,\nu,\lambda} = \sum_{\alpha,\beta,\gamma} c_{\alpha,\beta}^\mu c_{\alpha,\gamma}^\nu c_{\beta,\gamma}^\lambda$$

Newell-Littlewood numbers give some of the tensor product multiplicities of finite-dimensional representations of classical Lie groups of the types $B, C, D$.

The non-vanishing condition on Young diagram sizes $c_{\lambda,\mu}^\nu\neq 0 \implies |\lambda|+|\mu|=|\nu|$ leads to

$$N_{\mu,\nu,\lambda}\neq 0
\implies \left\{\begin{array}{l}||\lambda|-|\mu||\leq  |\nu|\leq |\lambda|+|\mu| \\ |\lambda|+|\mu|+|\nu| \in 2\mathbb{Z} \end{array}\right.$$

Newell-Littlewood numbers are generalizations of Littlewood–Richardson coefficients in the sense that

$$|\mu|+|\nu|=|\lambda| \implies N_{\mu,\nu,\lambda} = c_{\mu,\nu}^\lambda$$

Newell-Littlewood numbers that involve a Young diagram with only one row obey a Pieri-type rule: $N_{(k),\mu,\nu}$ is the number of ways to remove $\frac{k+|\mu|-|\nu|}{2}$ boxes from $\mu$ (from different columns), then add $\frac{k-|\mu|+|\nu|}{2}$ boxes (to different columns) to make $\nu$.

Newell-Littlewood numbers are the structure constants of an associative and commutative algebra whose basis elements are partitions, with the product $\mu\times \nu = \sum_\lambda N_{\mu,\nu,\lambda}\lambda$. For example,

$$(1)\times (k) = (k-1) + (k+1) + (k,1) \quad \text{(Newell–Littlewood)}$$
$$(1)\times (k) = (k+1) + (k,1) \quad \text{(Littlewood–Richardson)}$$

== Examples ==
The examples of Littlewood–Richardson coefficients below are given in terms of products of Schur polynomials S_{π}, indexed by partitions π, using the formula

$$S_\lambda S_\mu =\sum c_{\lambda\mu}^\nu S_\nu.$$

All coefficients with $|\nu|$ at most 4 are given by:

- S_{0}S_{π} = S_{π} for any π. where S_{0}=1 is the Schur polynomial of the empty partition
- S_{1}S_{1} = S_{2} + S_{11}
- S_{2}S_{1} = S_{3} + S_{21}
- S_{11}S_{1} = S_{111} + S_{21}
- S_{3}S_{1} = S_{4} + S_{31}
- S_{21}S_{1} = S_{31} + S_{22} + S_{211}
- S_{2}S_{2} = S_{4} + S_{31} + S_{22}
- S_{2}S_{11} = S_{31} + S_{211}
- S_{111}S_{1} = S_{1111} + S_{211}
- S_{11}S_{11} = S_{1111} + S_{211} + S_{22}

Most of the coefficients for small partitions are 0 or 1, which happens in particular whenever one of the factors is of the form S_{n} or S_{11...1}, because of Pieri's formula and its transposed counterpart. The simplest example with a coefficient larger than 1 happens when neither of the factors has this form:

- S_{21}S_{21} = S_{42} + S_{411} + S_{33} + 2S_{321} + S_{3111} + S_{222} + S_{2211}.

For larger partitions the coefficients become more complicated. For example,

- S_{321}S_{321} = S_{642} +S_{6411} +S_{633} +2S_{6321} +S_{63111} +S_{6222} +S_{62211} +S_{552} +S_{5511} +2S_{543} +4S_{5421} +2S_{54111} +3S_{5331} +3S_{5322} +4S_{53211} +S_{531111} +2S_{52221} +S_{522111} +S_{444} +3S_{4431} +2S_{4422} +3S_{44211} +S_{441111} +3S_{4332} +3S_{43311} +4S_{43221} +2S_{432111} +S_{42222} +S_{422211} +S_{3333} +2S_{33321} +S_{333111} +S_{33222} +S_{332211} with 34 terms and total multiplicity 62, and the largest coefficient is 4
- S_{4321}S_{4321} is a sum of 206 terms with total multiplicity is 930, and the largest coefficient is 18.
- S_{54321}S_{54321} is a sum of 1433 terms with total multiplicity 26704, and the largest coefficient (that of S_{86543211}) is 176.
- S_{654321}S_{654321} is a sum of 10873 terms with total multiplicity is 1458444 (so the average value of the coefficients is more than 100, and they can be as large as 2064).

The original example given by Littlewood & Richardson (1934, p. 122-124) was (after correcting for 3 tableaux they found but forgot to include in the final sum)

- S_{431}S_{221} = S_{652} + S_{6511} + S_{643} + 2S_{6421} + S_{64111} + S_{6331} + S_{6322} + S_{63211} + S_{553} + 2S_{5521} + S_{55111} + 2S_{5431} + 2S_{5422} + 3S_{54211} + S_{541111} + S_{5332} + S_{53311} + 2S_{53221} + S_{532111} + S_{4432} + S_{44311} + 2S_{44221} + S_{442111} + S_{43321} + S_{43222} + S_{432211}

with 26 terms coming from the following 34 tableaux:

....11 ....11 ....11 ....11 ....11 ....11 ....11 ....11 ....11    
...22  ...22  ...2   ...2   ...2   ...2   ...    ...    ...
.3     .      .23    .2     .3     .      .22    .2     .2     
       3             3      2      2      3      23     2      
                                   3                    3

....1  ....1  ....1  ....1  ....1  ....1  ....1  ....1  ....1   
...12  ...12  ...12  ...12  ...2   ...1   ...1   ...2   ...1
.23    .2     .3     .      .13    .22    .2     .1     .2      
       3      2      2      2      3      23     23     2
                     3                                  3

....1  ....1  ....1  ....1  ....1  ....1  ....1  ....1   
...2   ...2   ...2   ...    ...    ...    ...    ...    
.1     .3     .      .12    .12    .1     .2     .2      
2      1      1      23     2      22     13     1
3      2      2             3      3      2      2
              3                                  3

....   ....   ....   ....   ....   ....   ....   ....   
...1   ...1   ...1   ...1   ...1   ...    ...    ...    
.12    .12    .1     .2     .2     .11    .1     .1      
23     2      22     13     1      22     12     12
       3      3      2      2      3      23     2
                            3                    3

Calculating skew Schur functions is similar. For example, the 15 Littlewood–Richardson tableaux for ν=5432 and λ=331 are

...11 ...11 ...11 ...11 ...11 ...11 ...11 ...11 ...11 ...11 ...11 ...11 ...11 ...11 ...11
...2  ...2  ...2  ...2  ...2  ...2  ...2  ...2  ...2  ...2  ...2  ...2  ...2  ...2  ...2
.11   .11   .11   .12   .11   .12   .13   .13   .23   .13   .13   .12   .12   .23   .23
12    13    22    12    23    13    12    24    14    14    22    23    33    13    34

so S_{5432/331} = Σc^{ν}_{λμ} S_{μ} = S_{52} + S_{511} + S_{4111} + S_{2221} + 2S_{43} + 2S_{3211} + 2S_{322} + 2S_{331} + 3S_{421} (Fulton 1997, p. 64).
