= Picture (mathematics) =

In mathematics, specifically combinatorics, a picture is a bijection between skew diagrams satisfying certain properties, introduced by Andrei Zelevinsky. It generalizes the Robinson–Schensted correspondence and the Littlewood–Richardson rule.
