= Robinson algorithm =

Robinson algorithm may refer to:

- Robinson's Resolution Algorithm
- Robinson–Schensted correspondence
- Robinson's unification algorithm
