= Chinese monoid =

In mathematics, the Chinese monoid is a monoid generated by a totally ordered alphabet with the relations cba = cab = bca for every a ≤ b ≤ c. An algorithm similar to Schensted's algorithm yields characterisation of the equivalence classes and a cross-section theorem. It was discovered by Duchamp & Krob (1994) during their classification of monoids with growth similar to that of the plactic monoid, and studied in detail by Julien Cassaigne, Marc Espie, Daniel Krob, Jean-Christophe Novelli, and Florent Hivert in 2001.

The Chinese monoid has a regular language cross-section
$$a^* \ (ba)^*b^* \ (ca)^*(cb)^* c^* \cdots$$
and hence polynomial growth of dimension $\frac{n(n+1)}{2}$.

The Chinese monoid equivalence class of a permutation is the preimage of an involution under the map $w \mapsto w \circ w^{-1}$ where $\circ$ denotes the product in the Iwahori-Hecke algebra with $q_s = 0$.

== See also ==
- Plactic monoid
