= Plactic monoid =

Monoid of all words in the alphabet of positive integers modulo Knuth equivalence

In mathematics, the plactic monoid is the monoid of all words in the alphabet of positive integers modulo Knuth equivalence. Its elements can be identified with semistandard Young tableaux. It was discovered by Donald Knuth, who called it the tableau algebra, using an operation first defined by Craige Schensted in his study of the longest increasing subsequence of a permutation.

It was named by Alain Lascoux and Marcel-Paul Schützenberger, who allowed any totally-ordered alphabet in the definition. The etymology of the word "plactic" is unclear; it may refer to plate tectonics, as elementary relations that generate the equivalence allow conditional commutation of generator symbols: they can sometimes slide across each other (in apparent analogy to tectonic plates), but not freely.

== Definition ==
The plactic monoid over some totally-ordered alphabet (often the positive integers) is the monoid with the following presentation:

- the generators are the letters of the alphabet, and
- the relations are the elementary Knuth transformations $yzx\equiv yxz$ whenever $x < y \leq z$ and $xzy\equiv zxy$ whenever $x \leq y < z$.

=== Knuth equivalence ===
Two words are called Knuth equivalent if they represent the same element of the plactic monoid, i.e. if one can be obtained from the other by a sequence of elementary Knuth transformations.

Several properties are preserved by Knuth equivalence.

- If a word is a reverse lattice word, then so is any word Knuth equivalent to it.
- If two words are Knuth equivalent, then so are the words obtained by removing their rightmost maximal elements, as are the words obtained by removing their leftmost minimal elements.
- Knuth equivalence preserves the length of the longest non-decreasing subsequence, and more generally preserves the maximum of the sum of the lengths of $k$ disjoint non-decreasing subsequences for any fixed $k$.

=== Growth ===
The generating function of the plactic monoid on an alphabet of size $n$ is

$$\Gamma(t) = \frac{1}{(1-t)^n} \frac{1}{(1-t^2)^{n(n-1)/2}},$$

which shows that there is polynomial growth of dimension $\tfrac{n(n+1)}{2}$.

== Correspondence with semistandard Young tableaux ==
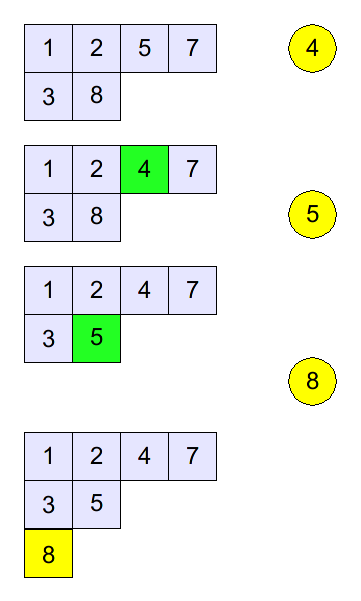
Multiplying the element with tableau form (38)(1257) with the generator 4, illustrated using Young tableau notation: • Using the plactic relations, (1257)*4 = 5*(1247) • (38)*5 = 8*(35), so (5) replaces (8) in the second row • (8) creates the third row • The product then has the tableau form (8)(35)(1247)

Every word is Knuth equivalent to the word of a unique semistandard Young tableau (this means that each row is non-decreasing and each column is strictly increasing) over the same ordered alphabet, where the tableau may be read by rows or by columns. So the elements of the plactic monoid can be identified with the semistandard Young tableaux, which therefore also form a monoid.

Multiplying the word of a semistandard Young tableau to the right with a generator is equivalent to Schensted insertion into the Young tableau. In row order, the word of the tableau is equivalent to a product of increasingly longer nondecreasing sequences of generators. The new generator may be inserted in its proper place by either appending it if it is larger, and otherwise by repeatedly applying the plactic relations to move the out of sequence element to the next row. In the latter case, the out of order element replaces the leftmost entry larger than it in each row, and the displaced element is then inserted in the next row.

Since Schensted insertion preserves Young tableaux, this gives an inductive proof that elements of the plactic monoid can be written in a standard form corresponding to a Young tableau, and the construction defines a natural product of semistandard tableaux.

=== Jeu de taquin ===
Two skew Young Tableaux are jeu de taquin equivalent if and only if their word readings are Knuth equivalent, i.e. correspond to equivalent elements of the plactic group. This gives an alternative definition of the plactic group product directly in terms of Young tableaux. Two tableaux may be multiplied by drawing them both around an empty rectangle to form a skew tableau, and using jeu de taquin slides to rectify it.

== Tableau ring ==
The tableau ring is the monoid ring of the plactic monoid, so it has a $\Z$-basis consisting of elements of the plactic monoid, with the same product as in the plactic monoid.

There is a homomorphism from the plactic ring on an alphabet to the ring of polynomials (with variables indexed by the alphabet) taking any tableau to the product of the variables of its entries, corresponding to the abelianization of the plactic semigroup.

== See also ==
- Chinese monoid
- Jeu de taquin
- Robinson-Schensted correspondence
- Duchamp, Gérard; Krob, Daniel (1994). "Plactic-growth-like monoids". In Ito, Masami; Jürgensen, Helmut (eds.). Words, Languages and Combinatorics II (Kyoto, 1992). Singapore: World Scientific. pp. 124–142. ISBN 978-981-4552-15-8. MR 1351284. Zbl 875.68720.
- Fulton, William (1997). Young Tableaux. London Mathematical Society Student Texts. Vol. 35. Cambridge University Press. ISBN 0-521-56724-6. MR 1464693. Zbl 0878.14034.
- Knuth, Donald E. (1970). "Permutations, matrices, and generalized Young tableaux". Pacific Journal of Mathematics. 34 (3): 709–727. doi:10.2140/pjm.1970.34.709. MR 0272654.
- Lascoux, Alain; Leclerc, B.; Thibon, J-Y. "The plastic monoid". Archived from the original on 18 July 2011.
- Lascoux, Alain; Schützenberger, Marcel P. (1981). "Le monoïde plaxique" (PDF). Noncommutative Structures in Algebra and Geometric Combinatorics (Naples, 1978). Quaderni de La Ricerca Scientifica (in French). Vol. 109. Rome: CNR. pp. 129–156. MR 0646486.
- Littelmann, Peter (1996). "A plactic algebra for semisimple Lie algebras". Advances in Mathematics. 124 (2): 312–331. doi:10.1006/aima.1996.0085. MR 1424313.
- Lothaire, M. (2002). Algebraic Combinatorics on Words. Encyclopedia of Mathematics and Its Applications. Vol. 90. Cambridge University Press. ISBN 978-0-521-81220-7. Zbl 1001.68093.
- Schensted, C. (1961). "Longest increasing and decreasing subsequences". Canadian Journal of Mathematics. 13: 179–191. doi:10.4153/CJM-1961-015-3. MR 0121305.
- Schützenberger, Marcel-Paul (1997). "Pour le monoïde plaxique". Mathématiques, Informatique et Sciences Humaines (in French) (140): 5–10. doi:10.4000/msh.2764. MR 1627563.
