= Young symmetrizer =

Element of the group algebra of a symmetric group

In mathematics, a Young symmetrizer is an element of the group algebra of the symmetric group $S_n$ whose natural action on tensor products $V^{\otimes n}$ of a complex vector space $V$ has as image an irreducible representation of the group of invertible linear transformations $GL(V)$. All irreducible representations of $GL(V)$ are thus obtained. It is constructed from the action of $S_n$ on the vector space $V^{\otimes n}$ by permutation of the different factors (or equivalently, from the permutation of the indices of the tensor components). A similar construction works over any field, but in positive characteristic (in particular, over finite fields) the image need not be an irreducible representation. The Young symmetrizers also act on the vector space of functions on Young tableau and the resulting representations are called Specht modules which again construct all complex irreducible representations of the symmetric group while the analogous construction in prime characteristic need not be irreducible. The Young symmetrizer is named after British mathematician Alfred Young.

== Definition ==
Given a finite symmetric group S_{n} and specific Young tableau λ corresponding to a numbered partition of n, and consider the action of $S_n$ given by permuting the boxes of $\lambda$. Define two permutation subgroups $P_\lambda$ and $Q_\lambda$ of S_{n} as follows:

$$P_\lambda=\{ g\in S_n : g \text{ preserves each row of } \lambda \}$$

and

$$Q_\lambda=\{ g\in S_n : g \text{ preserves each column of } \lambda \}.$$

Corresponding to these two subgroups, define two vectors in the group algebra $\mathbb{C}S_n$ as

$$a_\lambda=\sum_{g\in P_\lambda} e_g$$

and

$$b_\lambda=\sum_{g\in Q_\lambda} \sgn(g) e_g$$

where $e_g$ is the unit vector corresponding to g, and $\sgn(g)$ is the sign of the permutation. The product

$$c_\lambda := a_\lambda b_\lambda = \sum_{g\in P_\lambda,h\in Q_\lambda} \sgn(h) e_{gh}$$

is the Young symmetrizer corresponding to the Young tableau λ. Each Young symmetrizer corresponds to an irreducible representation of the symmetric group, and every irreducible representation can be obtained from a corresponding Young symmetrizer. (If we replace the complex numbers by more general fields the corresponding representations will not be irreducible in general.)

== Construction ==
Let V be any vector space over the complex numbers. Consider then the tensor product vector space $V^{\otimes n}=V \otimes V \otimes \cdots \otimes V$ (n times). Let S_{n} act on this tensor product space by permuting the indices. One then has a natural group algebra representation $\C S_n \to \operatorname{End} (V^{\otimes n})$ on $V^{\otimes n}$ (i.e. $V^{\otimes n}$ is a right $\C S_n$ module).

Given a partition λ of n, so that $n=\lambda_1+\lambda_2+ \cdots +\lambda_j$, then the image of $a_\lambda$ is

$$\operatorname{Im}(a_\lambda) := V^{\otimes n} a_\lambda \cong \operatorname{Sym}^{\lambda_1} V \otimes
\operatorname{Sym}^{\lambda_2} V \otimes \cdots \otimes \operatorname{Sym}^{\lambda_j} V.$$

For instance, if $n = 4$, and $\lambda = (2,2)$, with the canonical Young tableau $\{\{1,2\},\{3,4\}\}$. Then the corresponding $a_\lambda$ is given by

$$a_\lambda = e_{\text{id}} + e_{(1,2)} + e_{(3,4)} + e_{(1,2)(3,4)}.$$

For any product vector $v_{1,2,3,4}:=v_1 \otimes v_2 \otimes v_3 \otimes v_4$ of $V^{\otimes 4}$ we then have

$$v_{1,2,3,4} a_\lambda = v_{1,2,3,4} + v_{2,1,3,4} + v_{1,2,4,3} + v_{2,1,4,3} = (v_1 \otimes v_2 + v_2 \otimes v_1) \otimes (v_3 \otimes v_4 + v_4 \otimes v_3).$$

Thus the set of all $a_\lambda v_{1,2,3,4}$ clearly spans $\operatorname{Sym}^2 V\otimes \operatorname{Sym}^2 V$ and since the $v_{1,2,3,4}$ span $V^{\otimes 4}$ we obtain $V^{\otimes 4} a_\lambda= \operatorname{Sym}^2 V \otimes \operatorname{Sym}^2 V$, where we wrote informally $V^{\otimes 4} a_\lambda \equiv \operatorname{Im}(a_\lambda)$.

Notice also how this construction can be reduced to the construction for $n = 2$. Let $\mathbb{1} \in \operatorname{End} (V^{\otimes 2})$ be the identity operator and $S\in \operatorname{End} (V^{\otimes 2})$ the swap operator defined by $S(v\otimes w) = w \otimes v$, thus $\mathbb{1} = e_{\text{id}}$ and $S = e_{(1,2)}$. We have that

$$e_{\text{id}} + e_{(1,2)} = \mathbb{1} + S$$

maps into $\operatorname{Sym}^2 V$, more precisely

$$\frac{1}{2}(\mathbb{1} + S)$$

is the projector onto $\operatorname{Sym}^2 V$. Then

$$\frac{1}{4} a_\lambda = \frac{1}{4} (e_{\text{id}} + e_{(1,2)} + e_{(3,4)} + e_{(1,2)(3,4)}) = \frac{1}{4} (\mathbb{1} \otimes \mathbb{1} + S \otimes \mathbb{1} + \mathbb{1} \otimes S + S \otimes S) = \frac{1}{2}(\mathbb{1} + S) \otimes \frac{1}{2} (\mathbb{1} + S)$$

which is the projector onto $\operatorname{Sym}^2 V\otimes \operatorname{Sym}^2 V$.

The image of $b_\lambda$ is

$$\operatorname{Im}(b_\lambda) \cong \bigwedge^{\mu_1} V \otimes \bigwedge^{\mu_2} V \otimes \cdots \otimes \bigwedge^{\mu_k} V$$

where μ is the conjugate partition to λ. Here, $\operatorname{Sym}^i V$ and $\bigwedge^j V$ are the symmetric and alternating tensor product spaces.

The image $\C S_nc_\lambda$ of $c_\lambda = a_\lambda \cdot b_\lambda$ in $\C S_n$ is an irreducible representation of S_{n}, called a Specht module. We write

$$\operatorname{Im}(c_\lambda) = V_\lambda$$

for the irreducible representation.

Some scalar multiple of $c_\lambda$ is idempotent, that is $c^2_\lambda = \alpha_\lambda c_\lambda$ for some rational number $\alpha_\lambda\in\Q.$ Specifically, one finds $\alpha_\lambda=n! / \dim V_\lambda$. In particular, this implies that representations of the symmetric group can be defined over the rational numbers; that is, over the rational group algebra $\Q S_n$.

Consider, for example, S_{3} and the partition (2,1). Then one has

$$c_{(2,1)} = e_{123}+e_{213}-e_{321}-e_{312}.$$

If V is a complex vector space, then the images of $c_\lambda$ on spaces $V^{\otimes d}$ provides essentially all the finite-dimensional irreducible representations of GL(V).

== See also ==
- Representation theory of the symmetric group
