= Frobenius formula =

In mathematics, specifically in representation theory, the Frobenius formula, introduced by G. Frobenius, computes the characters of irreducible representations of the symmetric group S_{n}. Among the other applications, the formula can be used to derive the hook length formula.

== Statement ==
Let $\chi_\lambda$ be the character of an irreducible representation of the symmetric group $S_n$ corresponding to a partition $\lambda$ of n: $n = \lambda_1 + \cdots + \lambda_k$ and $\ell_j = \lambda_j + k - j$. For each partition $\mu$ of n, let $C(\mu)$ denote the conjugacy class in $S_n$ corresponding to it (cf. the example below), and let $i_j$ denote the number of times j appears in $\mu$ (so $\sum_j i_j j = n$). Then the Frobenius formula states that the constant value of $\chi_\lambda$ on $C(\mu),$

$$\chi_\lambda(C(\mu)),$$

is the coefficient of the monomial $x_1^{\ell_1} \dots x_k^{\ell_k}$ in the homogeneous polynomial in $k$ variables

$$\prod_{i < j}^k (x_i - x_j) \; \prod_j P_j(x_1, \dots, x_k)^{i_j},$$

where $P_j(x_1, \dots, x_k) = x_1^j + \dots + x_k^j$ is the $j$-th power sum.

Example: Take $n = 4$. Let $\lambda: 4 = 2 + 2 = \lambda_1 + \lambda_2$ and hence $k=2$, $\ell_1=3$, $\ell_2=2$. If $\mu: 4 = 1 + 1 + 1 + 1$ ($i_1=4$), which corresponds to the class of the identity element, then $\chi_\lambda(C(\mu))$ is the coefficient of $x_1^3 x_2^2$ in

$$(x_1 - x_2)P_1(x_1,x_2)^4=(x_1 - x_2)(x_1 + x_2)^4$$

which is 2. Similarly, if $\mu: 4 = 3 + 1$ (the class of a 3-cycle times an 1-cycle) and $i_1=i_3=1$, then $\chi_{\lambda}(C(\mu))$, given by

$$(x_1 - x_2)P_1(x_1,x_2)P_3(x_1,x_2)=(x_1 - x_2)(x_1 + x_2)(x_1^3 + x_2^3),$$

is −1.

For the identity representation, $k=1$ and $\lambda_1=n=\ell_1$. The character $\chi_\lambda(C(\mu))$ will be equal to the coefficient of $x_1^n$ in $\prod_j P_j(x_1)^{i_j}=\prod_j x_1^{i_j j}= x_1^{\sum_j i_j j}=x_1^n$, which is 1 for any $\mu$ as expected.

== Analogues ==
Arun Ram gives a q-analog of the Frobenius formula.

== See also ==
- Representation theory of symmetric groups
