= Baik–Deift–Johansson theorem =

The Baik–Deift–Johansson theorem is a result from probabilistic combinatorics. It deals with the subsequences of a randomly uniformly drawn permutation from the set $\{1,2,\dots,N\}$. The theorem makes a statement about the distribution of the length of the longest increasing subsequence in the limit. The theorem was influential in probability theory since it connected the KPZ-universality with the theory of random matrices.

The theorem was proven in 1999 by Jinho Baik, Percy Deift and Kurt Johansson.

== Statement ==
For each $N \geq 1$ let $\pi_N$ be a uniformly chosen permutation with length $N$. Let $l(\pi_N)$ be the length of the longest, increasing subsequence of $\pi_N$.

Then we have for every $x \in \mathbb{R}$ that

$$\mathbb{P}\left(\frac{l(\pi_N)-2\sqrt{N}}{N^{1/6}}\leq x \right)\to F_2(x),\quad N \to \infty$$

where $F_2(x)$ is the Tracy-Widom distribution of the Gaussian unitary ensemble.

== Literature ==
- Romik, Dan (2015). The Surprising Mathematics of Longest Increasing Subsequences. doi:10.1017/CBO9781139872003. ISBN 9781107075832.
- Corwin, Ivan (2018). "Commentary on "Longest increasing subsequences: From patience sorting to the Baik–Deift–Johansson theorem" by David Aldous and Persi Diaconis". Bulletin of the American Mathematical Society. 55 (3): 363–374. arXiv:1806.10542. doi:10.1090/bull/1623.
