= Bruce Sagan =

American mathematician

Bruce Eli Sagan
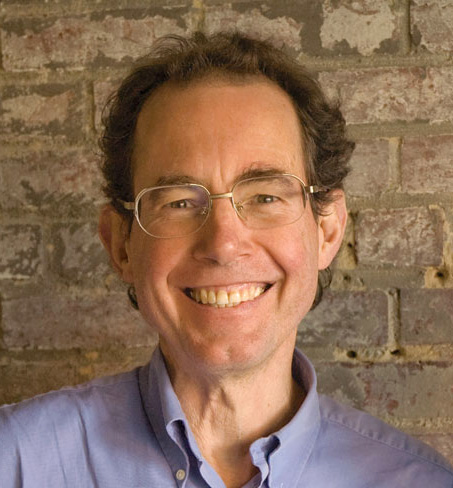
- Born: March 29, 1954 (age 72); Berkeley, California, U.S.
- Education: California State University, East Bay (B.S.); Massachusetts Institute of Technology (Ph.D.)
- Known for: Combinatorics; The Symmetric Group (textbook); Editor-in-Chief, Electronic Journal of Combinatorics
- Awards: Zorn Medal - Bronze (1994)
- Scientific career
- Fields: Mathematics; Combinatorics
- Workplaces: Michigan State University (Professor Emeritus)
- Doctoral advisor: Richard P. Stanley

Bruce Eli Sagan (born March 29, 1954) is an American Professor Emeritus of Mathematics at Michigan State University. He specializes in enumerative, algebraic, and topological combinatorics. He is also known as a musician, playing music from Scandinavia and the Balkans.

== Early life ==
Sagan is the son of Eugene Benjamin Sagan and Arlene Kaufmann Sagan, and a cousin of astronomer Carl Sagan. Growing up in Berkeley, California, Sagan began playing classical violin at a young age under the influence of his mother, a music teacher and conductor. After earning his B.S. in mathematics (1974) from California State University, East Bay (then called California State University, Hayward), Sagan pursued graduate studies at the Massachusetts Institute of Technology, where he received his Ph.D. in mathematics (1979). His doctoral thesis, "Partially Ordered Sets with Hooklengths – an Algorithmic Approach," was supervised by Richard P. Stanley, making Sagan Stanley's third doctoral student. During his graduate school years, Sagan also joined the Mandala Folkdance Ensemble, eventually becoming its music director.

== Mathematical career ==
Sagan held postdoctoral positions at Université Louis Pasteur (1979–1980), the University of Michigan (1980–1983), University College of Wales, Aberystwyth, Middlebury College (1984–1985), the University of Pennsylvania, and Université du Québec à Montréal (Fall, 1985), before becoming a faculty member at MSU in the Spring of 1986. He has held visiting positions at the Institute for Mathematics and its Applications (Spring, 1988), UCSD (Spring, 1991), the Royal Institute of Technology (1993–1994), MSRI (Winter, 1997), the Isaac Newton Institute (Winter, 2001), Mittag-Leffler Institute (Spring, 2005), and DIMACS (2005–2006). He was also a rotating Program Officer at the National Science Foundation (2007–2010).

Sagan has published over 100 research papers. He has given over 300 talks in North America, Europe, Asia, and Australia. These have included keynote addresses at the International Conference on Formal Power Series and Algebraic Combinatorics (2006), the British Combinatorial Conference (2011), and Permutation Patterns (2015). He has graduated 15 Ph.D. students. During his time at Michigan State University, he won two awards for teaching excellence.

Sagan has been an Editor-in-Chief for the Electronic Journal of Combinatorics since 2004.

== Books ==
- Mathematical Essays in Honor of Gian-Carlo Rota (co-edited with Richard P. Stanley), Birkhäuser, Cambridge, 1998, ISBN 0-8176-3872-5.
- The Symmetric Group: Representations, Combinatorial Algorithms, and Symmetric Functions, 2nd edition, Springer-Verlag, New York, 2001, ISBN 0-387-95067-2.
- Festschrift in Honor of Richard Stanley (special editor), Electronic Journal of Combinatorics, 2004–2006.

== Selected papers ==
- Bruce E. Sagan (1987). "Shifted tableaux, Schur Q-functions, and a conjecture of R. P. Stanley". Journal of Combinatorial Theory, Series A. 45: 62–103. doi:10.1016/0097-3165(87)90047-1.
- Andreas Blass & Bruce E. Sagan (1997). "Möbius functions of lattices". Advances in Mathematics. 127 (1): 94–123. arXiv:math/9801009. doi:10.1006/aima.1997.1616. S2CID 15840687.
- Bruce E. Sagan & Mercedes Rosas (2006). "Symmetric functions in noncommuting variables". Transactions of the American Mathematical Society. 358: 215–232. arXiv:math/0208168. doi:10.1090/S0002-9947-04-03623-2. MR 2171230. S2CID 3936228.
- Theodore Dokos; Tim Dwyer; Bryan Johnson; Bruce E. Sagan & Kimberly Selsor (2012). "Permutation Patterns and Statistics". Discrete Mathematics. 312 (18): 2760–2775. arXiv:1109.4976. doi:10.1016/j.disc.2012.05.014. S2CID 17700089..

== Musical career ==
Sagan plays music from the Scandinavian countries and the Balkans on fiddle and native instruments. These include the Swedish nyckelharpa, the Norwegian hardingfele, and the Bulgarian gadulka. In 1985 he and his then wife, Judy Barlas, founded the music and dance camp Scandinavian Week at Buffalo Gap (now known as Nordic Fiddles and Feet). He is currently a regular staff member at Northern Week at Ashokan run by Jay Ungar and Molly Mason. In 1994 he was awarded the Zorn Medal in Bronze for his playing in front of a jury of Swedish musicians. He has performed and given workshops in North America, Europe, and Australia. He plays Swedish music as a duo with Brad Battey and also with Lydia Ievens. His trio Veselba, with Nan Nelson and Chris Rietz, performs music from Bulgaria.

== Discography ==
- Andrea Hoag (fiddle, vocals) and Bruce Sagan (fiddle, hardingfele, nyckelharpa) with Larry Robinson (bouzouki), Spelstundarna, E. Thomas ETD 102, 1993. 20 tunes in Scandinavian style.
- Bruce Sagan (fiddle, hardingfele, nyckelharpa, gâdulka) with Brad Battey (fiddle), Nan Nelson (bass, tambura) and Chris Rietz (guitar, kaval), With Friends, 2002. 15 tunes in Scandinavian and Bulgarian styles. In a review of this album, the Swedish folkmusic magazine Spelmannen wrote that Sagan plays "som en inföding," i.e., "like a native."
- lydia ievins (fiddle, nyckelharpa) and Bruce Sagan (fiddle, nyckelharpa, hardingfele), Northlands, 2010. 18 tunes composed mainly by the performers in Scandinavian style. In a review of this album, Sing Out! wrote that it is "a delightful recording of two highly talented players."
- Brad Battey (fiddle, nyckelharpa) and Bruce Sagan (fiddle, nyckelharpa), Letter from America, 2020. 17 tunes composed by American musicians in Scandinavian style.
