= Alfred Young (mathematician) =

British mathematician (1873 – 1940)

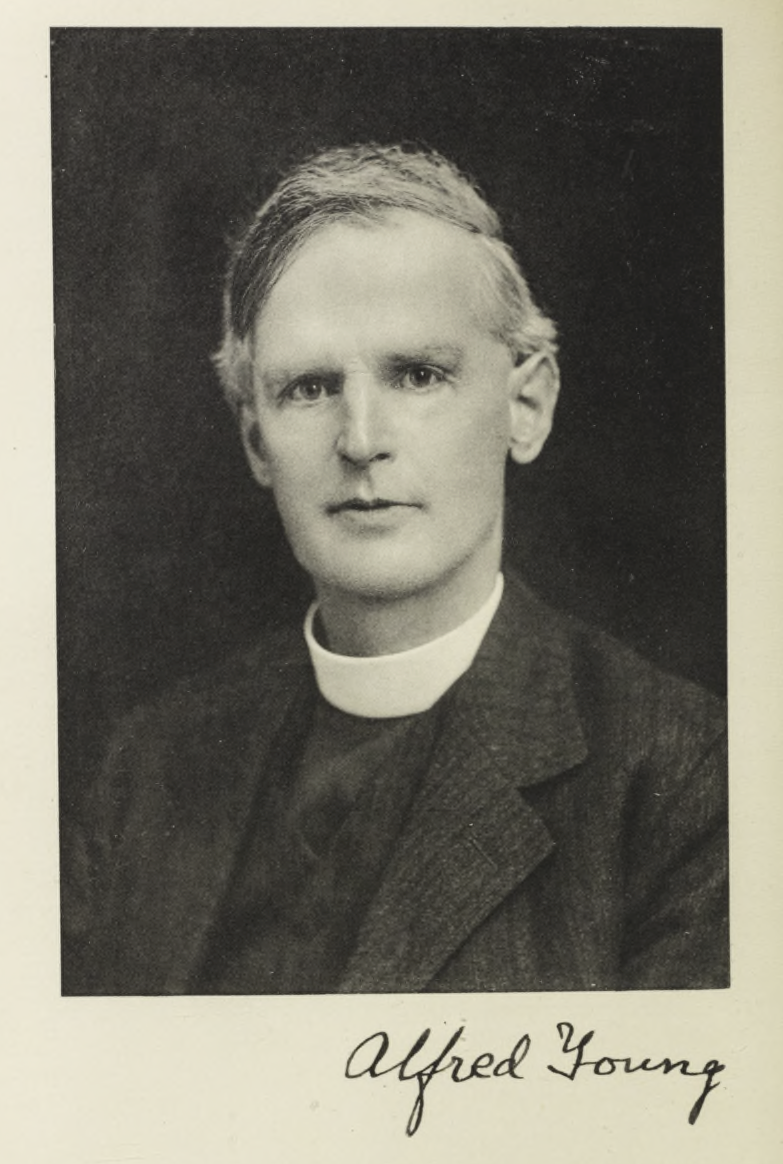
Alfred Young (1873–1940), Fellow of the Royal Society

Alfred Young, FRS (16 April 1873 – 15 December 1940) was a British mathematician.

He was born in Widnes, Lancashire, England, and educated at Monkton Combe School in Somerset and Clare College, Cambridge, graduating BA as 10th Wrangler in 1895. He is known for his work in the area of group theory. Both Young diagrams and Young tableaux (which he introduced in 1900) are named after him.

Young was appointed to the position of lecturer at Selwyn College, Cambridge, in 1901, transferring to Clare College in 1905. In 1902 he collaborated with John Hilton Grace on the book The Algebra of Invariants.

In 1907 he married Edith Clara née Wilson. In 1908 he became an ordained clergyman, and in 1910 became parish priest at Birdbrook in Essex, a village 25 miles east of Cambridge. He lived there for the rest of his life, but in 1926 began lecturing once again at Cambridge.

Most of his long series of papers on invariant theory and the symmetric group were written while he was a clergyman.

Young's ideas have had a significant impact on: (1) group representation theory, (2) combinatorics and statistics, (3) invariant theory, (4) physics and (5) chemistry. These topics intertwine sufficiently that a single result may have implications in more than one area.

== See also ==
- Hyperoctahedral group
- Young's lattice
- Young–Fibonacci lattice
- Young symmetrizer
- Representation theory of the symmetric group

== Bibliography ==
- Grace, J. H.; Young, Alfred (1903), The algebra of invariants, Cambridge University Press
- Young, Alfred (1977). Robinson, G. de B. (ed.). The collected papers of Alfred Young (1873–1940). Toronto, Ont.: University of Toronto Press. p. 684. ISBN 978-0-8020-2267-7. MR 0439548.
