= Gilbert de Beauregard Robinson =

Canadian mathematician (1906–1992)

Gilbert de Beauregard Robinson, MBE (3 June 1906 – 8 April 1992) was a Canadian mathematician most famous for his work on combinatorics and representation theory of the symmetric groups, including the Robinson-Schensted algorithm.

== Biography ==
Gilbert Robinson was born in Toronto in 1906. He then attended St. Andrew's College and graduated from the University of Toronto in 1927. He received his Ph.D. at Cambridge where his advisor was group theorist Alfred Young. He then joined the Mathematics Department in Toronto where he served until his retirement in 1971, except for a period of wartime service in Ottawa.

Robinson specialized in the study of the symmetric groups on which he became a recognized authority. In 1938 he formulated, in a paper studying the Littlewood–Richardson rule, a correspondence that would later become known as the Robinson-Schensted correspondence. He wrote some forty papers on the topic of symmetric groups. He also published The Foundations of Geometry (1940) and The Representations of the Symmetric Groups (1961) as well as Vector Geometry (1962). His last mathematical book was his edition of the collected papers of Alfred Young (1977), and he later wrote short volumes on departmental, local, and family history.

While in Ottawa, Robinson was one of the founding lecturers of Carleton University, and was also elected as a Fellow of the Royal Society of Canada in 1944. His wartime work on codes and cyphers, secret for many years, has now been described in Best Kept Secret by John H. Bryden and in "Canada's Bletchley Park: The Examination Unit in Ottawa's Sandy Hill 1941-1945" by Diana Pepall. He became director of the 'SIGINT Examination Unit' which conducted decoding work during the war and he played a role in establishing the decoding section which gave Canada some influence in this domain postwar. Robinson's wartime services were recognized by the award of the M.B.E.

Returning to the Toronto department Robinson was present at the founding conference of the Canadian Mathematical Congress in 1945, and with H.S.M. Coxeter he established the Canadian Journal of Mathematics which began publishing in 1949. He continued as the Managing Editor for thirty years. From 1953 to 1957, Robinson was the president of the Canadian Mathematical Society who, in 1995, named a prize in his honour.

Robinson undertook many professional and administrative responsibilities throughout his career, including the presidencies of the science section of the Royal Society of Canada, of the University of Toronto Settlement (a charitable foundation), the Faculty Club, the Society for the History and Philosophy of Mathematics, as Chairman of the NRC Associate Committee in Mathematics, and as the first Vice-President for Research Administration at the University of Toronto, in 1965-71. For these and other community services he received several medals and other awards from the federal and provincial governments.

Robinson died in Toronto in 1992.

== Selected publications ==
- 1938: "On representations of the symmetric group", American Journal of Mathematics 60: 745–760. doi:10.2307/2371609
- 1940: The Foundations of Geometry, University of Toronto Press, Toronto, Ontario, Canada, republished 1946, 1952, 4th edition 1959.
- 1954: (with J. S. Frame & Robert M. Thrall) The Hook Graphs of the Symmetric Group. Canadian Journal of Mathematics, 6, 316–324. doi:10.4153/CJM-1954-030-1
- 1955: (with O.E. Taulbee) On the Modular Representations of the Symmetric Group VI Proceedings of the National Academy of Sciences of the United States of America, 41(8): 596–8. doi:10.1073/pnas.41.8.596
- 1961: Representation Theory of the Symmetric Group, Edinburgh University Press.
- 1979: The Mathematics Department in the University of Toronto 1827 – 1978, University of Toronto Press, ISBN 0-7727-1600-5.

== Sources ==
- Bryden, John H. (1993) Best Kept Secret: Canadian Secret Intelligence in the Second World War, Key Porter Books ISBN 1-895555-29-9 .
