= Lattice word =

Type of string in formal language theory

In mathematics, a lattice word, or lattice permutation, is a string composed of positive integers in which every prefix contains at least as many integers i as integers i + 1.

A reverse lattice word, or Yamanouchi word (named after Takahiko Yamanouchi), is a string whose reversal is a lattice word.

For example, 11122121 is a lattice word, so its reversal 12122111 is a Yamanouchi word. However, 12122111 is not a lattice word since the prefix 12122 contains more 2s than 1s.

== See also ==
- Dyck word
