= Young tableau =

Combinatorial object in representation theory

In mathematics, a Young tableau (/tæˈbloʊ, ˈtæbloʊ/; plural: tableaux) is a combinatorial object useful in representation theory and Schubert calculus. It provides a convenient way to describe the group representations of the symmetric and general linear groups and to study their properties.

Young tableaux were introduced by Alfred Young, a mathematician at Cambridge University, in 1900. They were then applied to the study of the symmetric group by Georg Frobenius in 1903. Their theory was further developed by many mathematicians, including Percy MacMahon, W. V. D. Hodge, G. de B. Robinson, Gian-Carlo Rota, Alain Lascoux, Marcel-Paul Schützenberger and Richard P. Stanley.

== Definitions ==
Note: this article uses the English convention for displaying Young diagrams and tableaux.

=== Diagrams ===
Young diagram of shape (5, 4, 1), English notation

Young diagram of shape (5, 4, 1), French notation

A Young diagram (also called a Ferrers diagram, particularly when represented using dots) is a finite collection of boxes, or cells, arranged in left-justified rows, with the row lengths in non-increasing order. Listing the number of boxes in each row gives a partition λ of a non-negative integer n, the total number of boxes of the diagram. The Young diagram is said to be of shape λ, and it carries the same information as that partition. Containment of one Young diagram in another defines a partial ordering on the set of all partitions, which is in fact a lattice structure, known as Young's lattice. Listing the number of boxes of a Young diagram in each column gives another partition, the conjugate or transpose partition of λ; one obtains a Young diagram of that shape by reflecting the original diagram along its main diagonal.

There is almost universal agreement that in labeling boxes of Young diagrams by pairs of integers, the first index selects the row of the diagram, and the second index selects the box within the row. Nevertheless, two distinct conventions exist to display these diagrams, and consequently tableaux: the first places each row below the previous one, the second stacks each row on top of the previous one. Since the former convention is mainly used by Anglophones while the latter is often preferred by Francophones, it is customary to refer to these conventions respectively as the English notation and the French notation; for instance, in his book on symmetric functions, Macdonald advises readers preferring the French convention to "read this book upside down in a mirror" (Macdonald 1979, p. 2). This nomenclature probably started out as jocular. The English notation corresponds to the one universally used for matrices, while the French notation is closer to the convention of Cartesian coordinates; however, French notation differs from that convention by placing the vertical coordinate first. The figure on the right shows, using the English notation, the Young diagram corresponding to the partition (5, 4, 1) of the number 10. The conjugate partition, measuring the column lengths, is (3, 2, 2, 2, 1).

==== Arm and leg length ====
In many applications, for example when defining Jack functions, it is convenient to define the arm length a_{λ}(s) of a box s as the number of boxes to the right of s in the diagram λ in English notation. Similarly, the leg length l_{λ}(s) is the number of boxes below s. The hook length of a box s is the number of boxes to the right of s or below s in English notation, including the box s itself; in other words, the hook length is a_{λ}(s) + l_{λ}(s) + 1.

=== Tableaux ===
A standard Young tableau of shape (5, 4, 1): the numbers 1–10 in the boxes increase in every row and every column.

A Young tableau is obtained by filling in the boxes of the Young diagram with symbols taken from some alphabet, which is usually required to be a totally ordered set. Originally that alphabet was a set of indexed variables x_{1}, x_{2}, x_{3}, ..., but now one usually uses a set of numbers for brevity. In their original application to representations of the symmetric group, Young tableaux have n distinct entries, arbitrarily assigned to boxes of the diagram. A tableau is called standard if the entries in each row and each column are increasing. The number of distinct standard Young tableaux on n entries is given by the involution numbers

1, 1, 2, 4, 10, 26, 76, 232, 764, 2620, 9496, ... (sequence A000085 in the OEIS).

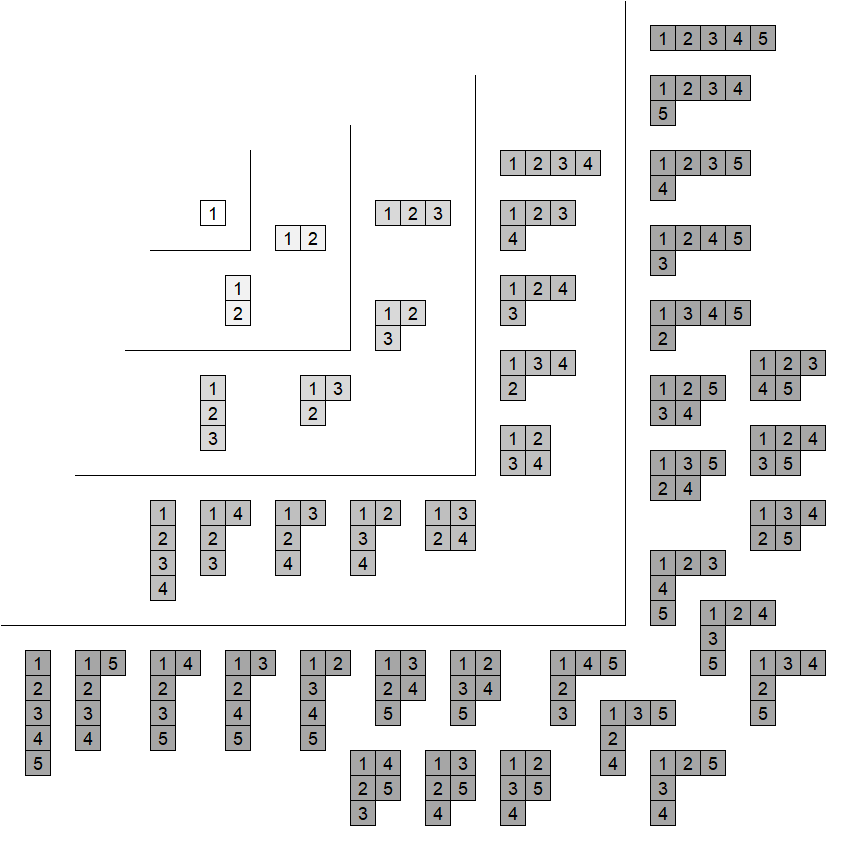
All standard Young tableaux with at most 5 boxes

In other applications, it is natural to allow the same number to appear more than once (or not at all) in a tableau. A tableau is called semistandard, or column strict, if the entries weakly increase along each row and strictly increase down each column. Recording the number of times each number appears in a tableau gives a sequence known as the weight of the tableau. Thus the standard Young tableaux are precisely the semistandard tableaux of weight (1, 1, ..., 1), which requires every integer up to n to occur exactly once.

In a standard Young tableau, the integer $k$ is a descent if $k+1$ appears in a row strictly below $k$. The sum of the descents is called the major index of the tableau.

=== Variations ===
There are several variations of this definition: for example, in a row-strict tableau the entries strictly increase along the rows and weakly increase down the columns. Also, tableaux with decreasing entries have been considered, notably, in the theory of plane partitions. There are also generalizations such as domino tableaux or ribbon tableaux, in which several boxes may be grouped together before assigning entries to them.

=== Skew tableaux ===
Skew tableau of shape (5, 4, 2, 2) / (2, 1), English notation

A skew shape is a pair of partitions (λ, μ) such that the Young diagram of λ contains the Young diagram of μ; it is denoted by λ/μ. If λ = (λ_{1}, λ_{2}, ...) and μ = (μ_{1}, μ_{2}, ...), then the containment of diagrams means that μ_{i} ≤ λ_{i} for all i. The skew diagram of a skew shape λ/μ is the set-theoretic difference of the Young diagrams of λ and μ: the set of squares that belong to the diagram of λ but not to that of μ. A skew tableau of shape λ/μ is obtained by filling the squares of the corresponding skew diagram; such a tableau is semistandard if entries increase weakly along each row, and increase strictly down each column, and it is standard if moreover all numbers from 1 to the number of squares of the skew diagram occur exactly once. While the map from partitions to their Young diagrams is injective, this is not the case for the map from skew shapes to skew diagrams; therefore the shape of a skew diagram cannot always be determined from the set of filled squares only. Although many properties of skew tableaux only depend on the filled squares, some operations defined on them do require explicit knowledge of λ and μ, so it is important that skew tableaux do record this information: two distinct skew tableaux may differ only in their shape, while they occupy the same set of squares, each filled with the same entries. Young tableaux can be identified with skew tableaux in which μ is the empty partition (0) (the unique partition of 0).

Any skew semistandard tableau T of shape λ/μ with positive integer entries gives rise to a sequence of partitions (or Young diagrams), by starting with μ, and taking for the partition i places further in the sequence the one whose diagram is obtained from that of μ by adding all the boxes that contain a value ≤ i in T; this partition eventually becomes equal to λ. Any pair of successive shapes in such a sequence is a skew shape whose diagram contains at most one box in each column; such shapes are called horizontal strips. This sequence of partitions completely determines T, and it is in fact possible to define (skew) semistandard tableaux as such sequences, as is done by Macdonald (Macdonald 1979, p. 4). This definition incorporates the partitions λ and μ in the data comprising the skew tableau.

== Overview of applications ==
Young tableaux have numerous applications in combinatorics, representation theory, and algebraic geometry. Various ways of counting Young tableaux have been explored and lead to the definition of and identities for Schur functions.

Many combinatorial algorithms on tableaux are known, including Schützenberger's jeu de taquin and the Robinson–Schensted–Knuth correspondence. Lascoux and Schützenberger studied an associative product on the set of all semistandard Young tableaux, giving it the structure called the plactic monoid (French: le monoïde plaxique).

In representation theory, standard Young tableaux of size k describe bases in irreducible representations of the symmetric group on k letters. The standard monomial basis in a finite-dimensional irreducible representation of the general linear group GL_{n} are parametrized by the set of semistandard Young tableaux of a fixed shape over the alphabet {1, 2, ..., n}. This has important consequences for invariant theory, starting from the work of Hodge on the homogeneous coordinate ring of the Grassmannian and further explored by Gian-Carlo Rota with collaborators, de Concini and Procesi, and Eisenbud. The Littlewood–Richardson rule describing (among other things) the decomposition of tensor products of irreducible representations of GL_{n} into irreducible components is formulated in terms of certain skew semistandard tableaux.

Applications to algebraic geometry center around Schubert calculus on Grassmannians and flag varieties. Certain important cohomology classes can be represented by Schubert polynomials and described in terms of Young tableaux.

== Applications in representation theory ==
Young diagrams are in one-to-one correspondence with irreducible representations of the symmetric group over the complex numbers. They provide a convenient way of specifying the Young symmetrizers from which the irreducible representations are built. Many facts about a representation can be deduced from the corresponding diagram. Below, we describe two examples: determining the dimension of a representation and restricted representations. In both cases, we will see that some properties of a representation can be determined by using just its diagram. Young tableaux are involved in the use of the symmetric group in quantum chemistry studies of atoms, molecules and solids.

Young diagrams also parametrize the irreducible polynomial representations of the general linear group GL_{n} (when they have at most n nonempty rows), or the irreducible representations of the special linear group SL_{n} (when they have at most n − 1 nonempty rows), or the irreducible complex representations of the special unitary group SU_{n} (again when they have at most n − 1 nonempty rows). In these cases semistandard tableaux with entries up to n play a central role, rather than standard tableaux; in particular it is the number of those tableaux that determines the dimension of the representation.

=== Dimension of a representation ===
Hook-lengths of the boxes for the partition 10 = 5 + 4 + 1

The dimension of the irreducible representation π_{λ} of the symmetric group S_{n} corresponding to a partition λ of n is equal to the number of different standard Young tableaux that can be obtained from the diagram of the representation. This number can be calculated by the hook length formula.

A hook length hook(x) of a box x in Young diagram Y(λ) of shape λ is the number of boxes that are in the same row to the right of it plus those boxes in the same column below it, plus one (for the box itself). By the hook-length formula, the dimension of an irreducible representation is n! divided by the product of the hook lengths of all boxes in the diagram of the representation:

$$\dim\pi_\lambda = \frac{n!}{\prod_{x \in Y(\lambda)} \operatorname{hook}(x)}.$$

The figure on the right shows hook-lengths for all boxes in the diagram of the partition 10 = 5 + 4 + 1. Thus

$$\dim\pi_\lambda = \frac{10!}{7\cdot5\cdot 4 \cdot 3\cdot 1\cdot 5\cdot 3\cdot 2\cdot 1\cdot1} = 288.$$

Similarly, the dimension of the irreducible representation W(λ) of GL_{r} corresponding to the partition λ of n (with at most r parts) is the number of semistandard Young tableaux of shape λ (containing only the entries from 1 to r), which is given by the hook-length formula:

$$\dim W(\lambda) = \prod_{(i,j) \in Y(\lambda)} \frac{r+j-i}{\operatorname{hook}(i,j)},$$

where the index i gives the row and j the column of a box. For instance, for the partition (5,4,1) we get as dimension of the corresponding irreducible representation of GL_{7} (traversing the boxes by rows):

$$\dim W(\lambda) = \frac{7\cdot 8\cdot 9\cdot 10\cdot 11\cdot 6\cdot 7\cdot 8\cdot 9\cdot 5}{7\cdot5\cdot 4 \cdot 3\cdot 1\cdot 5\cdot 3\cdot 2\cdot 1\cdot1} = 66 528.$$

=== Restricted representations ===
A representation of the symmetric group on n elements, S_{n} is also a representation of the symmetric group on n − 1 elements, S_{n−1}. However, an irreducible representation of S_{n} may not be irreducible for S_{n−1}. Instead, it may be a direct sum of several representations that are irreducible for S_{n−1}. These representations are then called the factors of the restricted representation (see also induced representation).

The question of determining this decomposition of the restricted representation of a given irreducible representation of S_{n}, corresponding to a partition λ of n, is answered as follows. One forms the set of all Young diagrams that can be obtained from the diagram of shape λ by removing just one box (which must be at the end both of its row and of its column); the restricted representation then decomposes as a direct sum of the irreducible representations of S_{n−1} corresponding to those diagrams, each occurring exactly once in the sum.

== See also ==
- Robinson–Schensted correspondence
- Schur–Weyl duality
