= Complexification =

Topic in mathematics

In mathematics, the complexification of a vector space V over the field of real numbers (a "real vector space") yields a vector space V^{C} over the complex number field, obtained by formally extending the scaling of vectors by real numbers to include their scaling ("multiplication") by complex numbers. Any basis for V (a space over the real numbers) may also serve as a basis for V^{C} over the complex numbers.

== Formal definition ==
Let $V$ be a real vector space. The complexification of V is defined by taking the tensor product of $V$ with the complex numbers (thought of as a 2-dimensional vector space over the reals):
$$V^{\Complex} = V\otimes_{\R} \Complex .$$
The subscript, $\R$, on the tensor product indicates that the tensor product is taken over the real numbers (since $V$ is a real vector space this is the only sensible option anyway, so the subscript can safely be omitted). As it stands, $V^{\Complex}$ is only a real vector space. However, we can make $V^{\Complex}$ into a complex vector space by defining complex multiplication as follows:
$$\alpha(v \otimes \beta) = v\otimes(\alpha\beta)\qquad\mbox{ for all } v\in V \mbox{ and }\alpha,\beta \in \Complex.$$
More generally, complexification is an example of extension of scalars – here extending scalars from the real numbers to the complex numbers – which can be done for any field extension, or indeed for any morphism of rings.

If $V$ has finite dimension $n$ over $\R$, then the $V^{\Complex}$ has dimension $2n$ as a real vector space and dimension $n$ as a complex vector space.

Formally, complexification is a functor Vect_{R} → Vect_{C}, from the category of real vector spaces to the category of complex vector spaces. This is the adjoint functor – specifically the left adjoint – to the forgetful functor Vect_{C} → Vect_{R} forgetting the complex structure.

This forgetting of the complex structure of a complex vector space $V$ is called decomplexification (or sometimes "realification"). The decomplexification of a complex vector space $V$ with basis $e_{\mu}$ removes the possibility of complex multiplication of scalars, thus yielding a real vector space $W_{\R}$ of twice the dimension with a basis $\{e_{\mu}, ie_{\mu}\}.$

== Basic properties ==
By the nature of the tensor product, every vector v in V^{C} can be written uniquely in the form

$$v = v_1\otimes 1 + v_2\otimes i$$

where v_{1} and v_{2} are vectors in V. It is a common practice to drop the tensor product symbol and just write

$$v = v_1 + iv_2.\,$$

Multiplication by the complex number a + i b is then given by the usual rule

$$(a+ib)(v_1 + iv_2) = (av_1 - bv_2) + i(bv_1 + av_2).\,$$

We can then regard V^{C} as the direct sum of two copies of V:

$$V^{\Complex} \cong V \oplus i V$$

with the above rule for multiplication by complex numbers.

There is a natural embedding of V into V^{C} given by

$$v\mapsto v\otimes 1.$$

The vector space V may then be regarded as a real subspace of V^{C}. If V has a basis { e_{i} } (over the field R) then a corresponding basis for V^{C} is given by { e_{i} ⊗ 1 } over the field C. The complex dimension of V^{C} is therefore equal to the real dimension of V:

$$\dim_{\Complex} V^{\Complex} = \dim_{\R} V.$$

Alternatively, rather than using tensor products, one can use this direct sum as the definition of the complexification:

$$V^{\Complex} := V \oplus V,$$

where $V^{\Complex}$ is given a linear complex structure by the operator J defined as $J(v,w) := (-w,v),$ where J encodes the operation of “multiplication by i”. In matrix form, J is given by:

$$J = \begin{bmatrix}0 & -I_V \\ I_V & 0\end{bmatrix}.$$

This yields the identical space – a real vector space with linear complex structure is identical data to a complex vector space – though it constructs the space differently. Accordingly, $V^{\Complex}$ can be written as $V \oplus JV$ or $V \oplus i V,$ identifying V with the first direct summand. This approach is more concrete, and has the advantage of avoiding the use of the technically involved tensor product, but is ad hoc.

== Examples ==
- The complexification of real coordinate space R^{n} is the complex coordinate space C^{n}.
- Likewise, if V consists of the m×n matrices with real entries, V^{C} would consist of m×n matrices with complex entries.

== Dickson doubling ==
The process of complexification by moving from R to C was abstracted by twentieth-century mathematicians including Leonard Dickson. One starts with using the identity mapping x* = x as a trivial involution on R. Next two copies of R are used to form z = (a , b) with the complex conjugation introduced as the involution z* = (a, −b). Two elements w and z in the doubled set multiply by

$$w z = (a,b) \times (c,d) = (ac\ - \ d^*b,\ da \ + \ b c^*).$$

Finally, the doubled set is given a norm N(z) = z* z. When starting from R with the identity involution, the doubled set is C with the norm a^{2} + b^{2}. If one doubles C, and uses conjugation (a, b)* = (a*, –b), the construction yields quaternions. Doubling again produces octonions, also called Cayley numbers. It was at this point that Dickson in 1919 contributed to uncovering algebraic structure.

The process can also be initiated with C and the trivial involution z* = z. The norm produced is simply z^{2}, unlike the generation of C by doubling R. When this C is doubled it produces bicomplex numbers, and doubling that produces biquaternions, and doubling again results in bioctonions. When the base algebra is associative, the algebra produced by this Cayley–Dickson construction is called a composition algebra since it can be shown that it has the property

$$N(p\,q) = N(p)\,N(q)\,.$$

== Complex conjugation ==
The complexified vector space V^{C} has more structure than an ordinary complex vector space. It comes with a canonical complex conjugation map:

$$\chi : V^{\Complex} \to \overline{V^{\Complex}}$$

defined by

$$\chi(v\otimes z) = v\otimes \bar z.$$

The map χ may either be regarded as a conjugate-linear map from V^{C} to itself or as a complex linear isomorphism from V^{C} to its complex conjugate $\overline {V^{\Complex}}$.

Conversely, given a complex vector space W with a complex conjugation χ, W is isomorphic as a complex vector space to the complexification V^{C} of the real subspace

$$V = \{ w \in W : \chi(w) = w \}.$$

In other words, all complex vector spaces with complex conjugation are the complexification of a real vector space.

For example, when W = C^{n} with the standard complex conjugation

$$\chi(z_1,\ldots,z_n) = (\bar z_1,\ldots,\bar z_n)$$

the invariant subspace V is just the real subspace R^{n}.

== Linear transformations ==
Given a real linear transformation f : V → W between two real vector spaces there is a natural complex linear transformation

$$f^{\Complex} : V^{\Complex} \to W^{\Complex}$$

given by

$$f^{\Complex}(v\otimes z) = f(v)\otimes z.$$

The map $f^{\Complex}$ is called the complexification of f. The complexification of linear transformations satisfies the following properties

- $(\mathrm{id}_V)^{\Complex} = \mathrm{id}_{V^{\Complex}}$
- $(f \circ g)^{\Complex} = f^{\Complex} \circ g^{\Complex}$
- $(f+g)^{\Complex} = f^{\Complex} + g^{\Complex}$
- $(a f)^{\Complex} = a f^{\Complex} \quad \forall a \in \R$

In the language of category theory one says that complexification defines an (additive) functor from the category of real vector spaces to the category of complex vector spaces.

The map f^{C} commutes with conjugation and so maps the real subspace of V^{C} to the real subspace of W^{C} (via the map f). Moreover, a complex linear map g : V^{C} → W^{C} is the complexification of a real linear map if and only if it commutes with conjugation.

As an example consider a linear transformation from R^{n} to R^{m} thought of as an m×n matrix. The complexification of that transformation is exactly the same matrix, but now thought of as a linear map from C^{n} to C^{m}.

== Dual spaces and tensor products ==
The dual of a real vector space V is the space V* of all real linear maps from V to R. The complexification of V* can naturally be thought of as the space of all real linear maps from V to C (denoted Hom_{R}(V,C)). That is,
$$(V^*)^{\Complex} = V^*\otimes \Complex \cong \mathrm{Hom}_{\Reals}(V,\Complex).$$

The isomorphism is given by
$$(\varphi_1\otimes 1 + \varphi_2\otimes i) \leftrightarrow \varphi_1 + i \varphi_2$$
where φ_{1} and φ_{2} are elements of V*. Complex conjugation is then given by the usual operation
$$\overline{\varphi_1 + i\varphi_2} = \varphi_1 - i \varphi_2.$$

Given a real linear map φ : V → C we may extend by linearity to obtain a complex linear map φ : V^{C} → C. That is,
$$\varphi(v\otimes z) = z\varphi(v).$$
This extension gives an isomorphism from Hom_{R}(V,C) to Hom_{C}(V^{C},C). The latter is just the complex dual space to V^{C}, so we have a natural isomorphism:
$$(V^*)^{\Complex} \cong (V^{\Complex})^*.$$

More generally, given real vector spaces V and W there is a natural isomorphism
$$\mathrm{Hom}_{\Reals}(V,W)^{\Complex} \cong \mathrm{Hom}_{\Complex}(V^{\Complex},W^{\Complex}).$$

Complexification also commutes with the operations of taking tensor products, exterior powers and symmetric powers. For example, if V and W are real vector spaces there is a natural isomorphism
$$(V \otimes_{\Reals} W)^{\Complex} \cong V^{\Complex} \otimes_{\Complex} W^{\Complex}\,.$$
Note the left-hand tensor product is taken over the reals while the right-hand one is taken over the complexes. The same pattern is true in general. For instance, one has
$$(\Lambda_{\Reals}^k V)^{\Complex} \cong \Lambda_{\Complex}^k (V^{\Complex}).$$
In all cases, the isomorphisms are the “obvious” ones.

== See also ==
- Extension of scalars – general process
- Linear complex structure
- Baker–Campbell–Hausdorff formula
