= Matrix consimilarity =

In linear algebra, two n-by-n matrices A and B are called consimilar if

$$A = S B \bar{S}^{-1} \,$$

for some invertible $n \times n$ matrix $S$, where $\bar{S}$ denotes the elementwise complex conjugation. So for real matrices similar by some real matrix $S$, consimilarity is the same as matrix similarity.

Like ordinary similarity, consimilarity is an equivalence relation on the set of $n \times n$ matrices, and it is reasonable to ask what properties it preserves.

The theory of ordinary similarity arises as a result of studying linear transformations referred to different bases. Consimilarity arises as a result of studying antilinear transformations referred to different bases.

A matrix is consimilar to itself, its complex conjugate, its transpose and its adjoint matrix. Every matrix is consimilar to a real matrix and to a Hermitian matrix. There is a standard form for the consimilarity class, analogous to the Jordan normal form.
