= Fundamental theorem of Hilbert spaces =

On surjectivity of linear map to anti-dual

In mathematics, specifically in functional analysis and Hilbert space theory, the fundamental theorem of Hilbert spaces gives a necessary and sufficient condition for a Hausdorff pre-Hilbert space to be a Hilbert space in terms of the canonical isometry of a pre-Hilbert space into its anti-dual.

== Preliminaries ==
=== Antilinear functionals and the anti-dual ===
Suppose that $H$ is a topological vector space (TVS). A function $f:H\to\mathbb{C}$ is called semilinear or antilinear if for all $x,y\in H$ and all scalars $c$,

- $f$ is additive: $f(x+y)=f(x)+f(y)$;
- $f$ is conjugate homogeneous: $f(c\,x)=\bar{c}\,f(x)$.

The vector space of all continuous antilinear functions on $H$ is called the anti-dual space or complex conjugate dual space of $H$ and is denoted by $\overline{H}^{\prime}$. (In contrast, the continuous dual space of $H$ is denoted by $H^{\prime}$), which we make into a normed space by endowing it with the canonical norm (defined in the same way as the canonical norm on the continuous dual space of $H$.)

=== Pre-Hilbert spaces and sesquilinear forms ===
A sesquilinear form is a map $B:H\times H\to\mathbb{C}$ such that for all $y\in H$, the map defined by $x\mapsto B(x,y)$ is linear, and for all $x\in H$, the map defined by $y\mapsto B(x,y)$ is antilinear. Note that in Physics, the convention is that a sesquilinear form is linear in its second coordinate and antilinear in its first coordinate.

A sesquilinear form $B$ on $H$ is called positive definite if $B(x,x)>0$ for all non-0 $x\in H$; it is called non-negative if $B(x,x)\ge 0$ for all $x\in H$. A sesquilinear form $B$ on $H$ is called a Hermitian form if in addition it has the property that $B(x, y) = \overline{B(y, x)}$ for all $x,y\in H$.

=== Pre-Hilbert and Hilbert spaces ===
A pre-Hilbert space is a pair consisting of a vector space $H$ and a non-negative sesquilinear form $B$ on $H$; if in addition this sesquilinear form $B$ is positive definite then $(H,B)$ is called a Hausdorff pre-Hilbert space. If $B$ is non-negative then it induces a canonical seminorm on $H$, denoted by $\| \cdot \|$, defined by $x\mapsto B(x,x)^{1/2}$, where if $B$ is also positive definite then this map is a norm. This canonical semi-norm makes every pre-Hilbert space into a seminormed space and every Hausdorff pre-Hilbert space into a normed space. The sesquilinear form $B:H\times H\to\mathbb{C}$ is separately uniformly continuous in each of its two arguments and hence can be extended to a separately continuous sesquilinear form on the completion of $H$; if $H$ is Hausdorff then this completion is a Hilbert space. A Hausdorff pre-Hilbert space that is complete is called a Hilbert space.

=== Canonical map into the anti-dual ===
Suppose $(H,B)$is a pre-Hilbert space. If $h\in H$, we define the canonical maps:

$B(h,\cdot):H\mapsto\mathbb{C}$ where $y\mapsto B(h,y)$, and
$B(\cdot,h):H\mapsto\mathbb{C}$ where $x\mapsto B(x,y)$.

The canonical map from $H$ into its anti-dual $\overline{H}^{\prime}$ is the map

$H \to \overline{H}^{\prime}$ defined by $x\mapsto B(x,\cdot)$.

If $(H,B)$ is a pre-Hilbert space then this canonical map is linear and continuous; this map is an isometry onto a vector subspace of the anti-dual if and only if $(H,B)$ is a Hausdorff pre-Hilbert.

There is of course a canonical antilinear surjective isometry $H^{\prime} \to \overline{H}^{\prime}$ that sends a continuous linear functional $f$ on $H$ to the continuous antilinear functional denoted by $\bar f$ and defined by $x\mapsto\overline{f(x)}$.

== Fundamental theorem ==
Fundamental theorem of Hilbert spaces—Suppose that $(H,B)$ is a Hausdorff pre-Hilbert space where $B:H\times H\to\mathbb{C}$ is a sesquilinear form that is linear in its first coordinate and antilinear in its second coordinate. Then the canonical linear mapping from $H$ into the anti-dual space of $H$ is surjective if and only if $(H,B)$ is a Hilbert space, in which case the canonical map is a surjective isometry of $H$ onto its anti-dual.

== See also ==
- Complex conjugate vector space
- Dual system
- Linear map
- Riesz representation theorem
- Sesquilinear form
