= Sesquilinear form =

Generalization of complex inner products

In mathematics, a sesquilinear form is a generalization of inner products of complex vector spaces, which are the most common sesquilinear forms. A bilinear form is linear in each of its arguments, but a sesquilinear form allows one of the arguments to be "twisted" in a semilinear manner, thus the name; which originates from the Latin numerical prefix sesqui- meaning "one and a half". The basic concept of inner products – producing a scalar from a pair of vectors – can be generalized by allowing a broader range of scalar values and, perhaps simultaneously, by widening the definition of a vector.

A motivating special case is a sesquilinear form on a complex vector space, V. This is a map V × V → C that is linear in one argument and "twists" the linearity of the other argument by complex conjugation (referred to as being antilinear in the other argument). This case arises naturally in mathematical physics applications. Another important case allows the scalars to come from any field and the twist is provided by a field automorphism.

An application in projective geometry requires that the scalars come from a division ring (skew field), K, and this means that the "vectors" should be replaced by elements of a K-module. In a very general setting, sesquilinear forms can be defined over R-modules for arbitrary rings R.

== Informal introduction ==
Sesquilinear forms abstract and generalize the basic notion of a Hermitian form on complex vector space. Hermitian forms are commonly seen in physics, as the inner product on a complex Hilbert space. In such cases, the standard Hermitian form on C^{n} is given by

$$\langle w,z \rangle = \sum_{i=1}^n \overline{w}_i z_i.$$

where $\overline{w}_i$ denotes the complex conjugate of $w_i ~.$ This product may be generalized to situations where one is not working with an orthonormal basis for C^{n}, or even any basis at all. By inserting an extra factor of $i$ into the product, one obtains the skew-Hermitian form, defined more precisely, below. There is no particular reason to restrict the definition to the complex numbers; it can be defined for arbitrary rings carrying an antiautomorphism, informally understood to be a generalized concept of "complex conjugation" for the ring.

== Convention ==
Conventions differ as to which argument should be linear. In the commutative case, we shall take the first to be linear, as is common in the mathematical literature, except in the section devoted to sesquilinear forms on complex vector spaces. There we use the other convention and take the first argument to be conjugate-linear (i.e. antilinear) and the second to be linear. This is the convention used mostly by physicists and originates in Dirac's bra–ket notation in quantum mechanics. It is also consistent with the definition of the usual (Euclidean) product of $w,z\in\mathbb C^n$ as $w^*z$.

In the more general noncommutative setting, with right modules we take the second argument to be linear and with left modules we take the first argument to be linear.

== Complex vector spaces ==
Assumption: In this section, sesquilinear forms are antilinear in their first argument and linear in their second.

Over a complex vector space $V$ a map $\varphi : V \times V \to \Complex$ is sesquilinear if

$$\begin{align}
&\varphi(x + y, z + w) = \varphi(x, z) + \varphi(x, w) + \varphi(y, z) + \varphi(y, w)\\
&\varphi(a x, b y) = \overline{a}b\,\varphi(x,y)\end{align}$$

for all $x, y, z, w \in V$ and all $a, b \in \Complex.$ Here, $\overline{a}$ is the complex conjugate of a scalar $a.$

A complex sesquilinear form can also be viewed as a complex bilinear map
$$\overline{V} \times V \to \Complex$$
where $\overline{V}$ is the complex conjugate vector space to $V.$ By the universal property of tensor products these are in one-to-one correspondence with complex linear maps
$$\overline{V} \otimes V \to \Complex.$$

For a fixed $z \in V$ the map $w \mapsto \varphi(z, w)$ is a linear functional on $V$ (i.e. an element of the dual space $V^*$). Likewise, the map $w \mapsto \varphi(w, z)$ is a conjugate-linear functional on $V.$

Given any complex sesquilinear form $\varphi$ on $V$ we can define a second complex sesquilinear form $\psi$ via the conjugate transpose:
$$\psi(w,z) = \overline{\varphi(z,w)}.$$
In general, $\psi$ and $\varphi$ will be different. If they are the same then $\varphi$ is said to be Hermitian. If they are negatives of one another, then $\varphi$ is said to be skew-Hermitian. Every sesquilinear form can be written as a sum of a Hermitian form and a skew-Hermitian form.

=== Matrix representation ===
If $V$ is a finite-dimensional complex vector space, then relative to any basis $\left\{ e_i \right\}_i$ of $V,$ a sesquilinear form is represented by a matrix $A,$ and given by
$$\varphi(w,z) = \varphi \left(\sum_i w_i e_i, \sum_j z_j e_j \right) = \sum_i \sum_j \overline{w_i} z_j \varphi\left(e_i, e_j\right) = w^\dagger A z .$$
where $w^\dagger$ is the conjugate transpose. The components of the matrix $A$ are given by $A_{ij} := \varphi\left(e_i, e_j\right).$

=== Hermitian form ===
The term Hermitian form may also refer to a different concept than that explained below: it may refer to a certain differential form on a Hermitian manifold.

A complex Hermitian form (also called a symmetric sesquilinear form), is a sesquilinear form $h : V \times V \to \Complex$ such that
$$h(w,z) = \overline{h(z, w)}.$$
The standard Hermitian form on $\Complex^n$ is given (again, using the "physics" convention of linearity in the second and conjugate linearity in the first variable) by
$$\langle w,z \rangle = \sum_{i=1}^n \overline{w}_i z_i.$$
More generally, the inner product on any complex Hilbert space is a Hermitian form.

A minus sign is introduced in the Hermitian form $w w^* - z z^*$ to define the group SU(1,1).

A vector space with a Hermitian form $(V, h)$ is called a Hermitian space.

The matrix representation of a complex Hermitian form is a Hermitian matrix.

A complex Hermitian form applied to a single vector
$$|z|_h = h(z, z)$$
is always a real number. One can show that a complex sesquilinear form is Hermitian if and only if the associated quadratic form is real for all $z \in V.$

=== Skew-Hermitian form ===
A complex skew-Hermitian form (also called an antisymmetric sesquilinear form), is a complex sesquilinear form $s : V \times V \to \Complex$ such that
$$s(w,z) = -\overline{s(z, w)}.$$
Every complex skew-Hermitian form can be written as the imaginary unit $i := \sqrt{-1}$ times a Hermitian form.

The matrix representation of a complex skew-Hermitian form is a skew-Hermitian matrix.

A complex skew-Hermitian form applied to a single vector
$$|z|_s = s(z, z)$$
is always a purely imaginary number.

== Over a division ring ==
This section applies unchanged when the division ring K is commutative. More specific terminology then also applies: the division ring is a field, the anti-automorphism is also an automorphism, and the right module is a vector space. The following applies to a left module with suitable reordering of expressions.

=== Definition ===
A σ-sesquilinear form over a right K-module M is a bi-additive map φ : M × M → K with an associated anti-automorphism σ of a division ring K such that, for all x, y in M and all α, β in K,

$$\varphi(x \alpha, y \beta) = \sigma(\alpha) \, \varphi(x, y) \, \beta .$$

The associated anti-automorphism σ for any nonzero sesquilinear form φ is uniquely determined by φ.

=== Orthogonality ===
Given a sesquilinear form φ over a module M and a subspace (submodule) W of M, the orthogonal complement of W with respect to φ is

$$W^{\perp}=\{\mathbf{v} \in M \mid \varphi (\mathbf{v}, \mathbf{w})=0,\ \forall \mathbf{w}\in W\} .$$

Similarly, x ∈ M is orthogonal to y ∈ M with respect to φ, written x ⊥_{φ} y (or simply x ⊥ y if φ can be inferred from the context), when φ(x, y) = 0. This relation need not be symmetric, i.e. x ⊥ y does not imply y ⊥ x (but see § Reflexivity below).

=== Reflexivity ===
A sesquilinear form φ is reflexive if, for all x, y in M,

$\varphi(x, y) = 0$ implies $\varphi(y, x) = 0.$

That is, a sesquilinear form is reflexive precisely when the derived orthogonality relation is symmetric.

=== Hermitian variations ===
A σ-sesquilinear form φ is called (σ, ε)-Hermitian if there exists ε in K such that, for all x, y in M,

$$\varphi(x, y) = \sigma ( \varphi (y, x)) \, \varepsilon .$$

If ε = 1, the form is called σ-Hermitian, and if ε = −1, it is called σ-anti-Hermitian. (When σ is implied, respectively simply Hermitian or anti-Hermitian.)

For a nonzero (σ, ε)-Hermitian form, it follows that for all α in K,

$$\sigma ( \varepsilon ) = \varepsilon^{-1}$$
$$\sigma ( \sigma ( \alpha ) ) = \varepsilon \alpha \varepsilon^{-1} .$$

It also follows that φ(x, x) is a fixed point of the map α ↦ σ(α)ε. The fixed points of this map form a subgroup of the additive group of K.

A (σ, ε)-Hermitian form is reflexive, and every reflexive σ-sesquilinear form is (σ, ε)-Hermitian for some ε.

In the special case that σ is the identity map (i.e., σ = id), K is commutative, φ is a bilinear form and ε^{2} = 1. Then for ε = 1 the bilinear form is called symmetric, and for ε = −1 is called skew-symmetric.

=== Example ===
Let V be the three dimensional vector space over the finite field F = GF(q^{2}), where q is a prime power. With respect to the standard basis we can write x = (x_{1}, x_{2}, x_{3}) and y = (y_{1}, y_{2}, y_{3}) and define the map φ by:

$$\varphi(x, y) = x_1 y_1{}^q + x_2 y_2{}^q + x_3 y_3{}^q.$$

The map σ : t ↦ t^{q} is an involutory automorphism of F. The map φ is then a σ-sesquilinear form. The matrix M_{φ} associated to this form is the identity matrix. This is a Hermitian form.

== In projective geometry ==
Assumption: In this section, sesquilinear forms are antilinear (resp. linear) in their second (resp. first) argument.

In a projective geometry G, a permutation δ of the subspaces that inverts inclusion, i.e.

S ⊆ T ⇒ T^{δ} ⊆ S^{δ} for all subspaces S, T of G,

is called a correlation. A result of Birkhoff and von Neumann (1936) shows that the correlations of desarguesian projective geometries correspond to the nondegenerate sesquilinear forms on the underlying vector space. A sesquilinear form φ is nondegenerate if φ(x, y) = 0 for all y in V (if and) only if x = 0.

To achieve full generality of this statement, and since every desarguesian projective geometry may be coordinatized by a division ring, Reinhold Baer extended the definition of a sesquilinear form to a division ring, which requires replacing vector spaces by R-modules. (In the geometric literature these are still referred to as either left or right vector spaces over skewfields.)

== Over arbitrary rings ==
The specialization of the above section to skewfields was a consequence of the application to projective geometry, and not intrinsic to the nature of sesquilinear forms. Only the minor modifications needed to take into account the non-commutativity of multiplication are required to generalize the arbitrary field version of the definition to arbitrary rings.

Let R be a ring, V an R-module and σ an antiautomorphism of R.

A map φ : V × V → R is σ-sesquilinear if

$$\varphi(x + y, z + w) = \varphi(x, z) + \varphi(x, w) + \varphi(y, z) + \varphi(y, w)$$
$$\varphi(c x, d y) = c \, \varphi(x,y) \, \sigma(d)$$

for all x, y, z, w in V and all c, d in R.

An element x is orthogonal to another element y with respect to the sesquilinear form φ (written x ⊥ y) if φ(x, y) = 0. This relation need not be symmetric, i.e. x ⊥ y does not imply y ⊥ x.

A sesquilinear form φ : V × V → R is reflexive (or orthosymmetric) if φ(x, y) = 0 implies φ(y, x) = 0 for all x, y in V.

A sesquilinear form φ : V × V → R is Hermitian if there exists σ such that

$$\varphi(x, y) = \sigma(\varphi(y, x))$$

for all x, y in V. A Hermitian form is necessarily reflexive, and if it is nonzero, the associated antiautomorphism σ is an involution (i.e. of order 2).

Since for an antiautomorphism σ we have σ(st) = σ(t)σ(s) for all s, t in R, if σ = id, then R must be commutative and φ is a bilinear form. In particular, if, in this case, R is a skewfield, then R is a field and V is a vector space with a bilinear form.

An antiautomorphism σ : R → R can also be viewed as an isomorphism R → R^{op}, where R^{op} is the opposite ring of R, which has the same underlying set and the same addition, but whose multiplication operation (∗) is defined by a ∗ b = ba, where the product on the right is the product in R. It follows from this that a right (left) R-module V can be turned into a left (right) R^{op}-module, V^{o}. Thus, the sesquilinear form φ : V × V → R can be viewed as a bilinear form φ′ : V × V^{o} → R.

== See also ==
- *-ring
