= Transpose of a linear map =

Induced map between the dual spaces of the two vector spaces

In linear algebra and functional analysis, the transpose or algebraic adjoint of a linear map between two vector spaces, defined over the same field, is an induced map between the dual spaces of the two vector spaces. The transpose is often used to study the original linear map. This concept is generalised by adjoint functors.

== Definition ==
Let $X^{\#}$ denote the algebraic dual space of a vector space $X$. Let $X$ and $Y$ be vector spaces over the same field $\mathcal{K}$. If $u : X \to Y$ is a linear map, then its algebraic adjoint, or dual, is the map ${}^{\#\!} u : Y^{\#} \to X^{\#}$ defined by $f \mapsto f \circ u$. The resulting functional ${}^{\#\!} u(f) := f \circ u$ is called the pullback of $f$ by $u$.

The continuous dual space of a topological vector space (TVS) $X$ is denoted by $X^{\prime}$. If $X$ and $Y$ are TVSs then a linear map $u : X \to Y$ is weakly continuous if and only if ${}^{\#\!} u\left(Y^{\prime}\right) \subseteq X^{\prime}$, in which case we let ${}^\text{t}\! u : Y^{\prime} \to X^{\prime}$ denote the restriction of ${}^{\#\!} u$ to $Y^{\prime}$. The map ${}^\text{t}\! u$ is called the transpose or algebraic adjoint of $u$. The following identity characterizes the transpose of $u$:
$$\left\langle {}^\text{t}\! u(f), x \right\rangle = \left\langle f, u(x) \right\rangle \quad \text{ for all } f \in Y ^{\prime} \text{ and } x \in X,$$
where $\left\langle \cdot, \cdot \right\rangle$ is the natural pairing defined by ${{{1}}}$.

== Properties ==
The assignment $u \mapsto {}^\text{t}\! u$ produces an injective linear map between the space of linear operators from $X$ to $Y$ and the space of linear operators from $Y^{\#}$ to $X^{\#}$. If $X = Y$ then the space of linear maps is an algebra under composition of maps, and the assignment is then an antihomomorphism of algebras, meaning that ${}^\text{t}\! (u v) = {}^\text{t}\! v \ {}^\text{t}\! u$. In the language of category theory, taking the dual of vector spaces and the transpose of linear maps is therefore a contravariant functor from the category of vector spaces over $\mathcal{K}$ to itself. One can identify ${}^\text{t}\!\! \left({}^\text{t}\! u\right)$ with $u$ using the natural injection into the double dual.

- If $u : X \to Y$ and $v : Y \to Z$ are linear maps then ${}^\text{t}\! (v \circ u) = {}^\text{t}\! u \circ {}^\text{t}\! v$
- If $u : X \to Y$ is a (surjective) vector space isomorphism then so is the transpose ${}^\text{t}\! u : Y^{\prime} \to X^{\prime}$.
- If $X$ and $Y$ are normed spaces then

$$\|x\| = \sup_{\|x^{\prime}\| \leq 1} \left|x^{\prime}(x) \right| \quad \text{ for each } x \in X$$
and if the linear operator $u : X \to Y$ is bounded then the operator norm of ${}^\text{t}\! u$ is equal to the norm of $u$; that is
$$\|u\| = \left\|{}^\text{t}\! u\right\|,$$
and moreover,
$$\|u\| = \sup \left\{\left| y^{\prime}(u x) \right| : \|x\| \leq 1, \left\|y^\prime\right\| \leq 1 \text{ where } x \in X, y^{\prime} \in Y^{\prime} \right\}.$$

- A bounded linear operator between Banach spaces is compact if and only if its adjoint is compact (Schauder's theorem).

=== Polars ===
Suppose now that $u : X \to Y$ is a weakly continuous linear operator between topological vector spaces $X$ and $Y$ with continuous dual spaces $X^{\prime}$ and $Y^{\prime}$, respectively. Let $\langle \cdot, \cdot \rangle : X \times X^{\prime} \to \Complex$ denote the canonical dual system, defined by $\left\langle x, x^{\prime} \right\rangle = x^{\prime} x$ where $x$ and $x^{\prime}$ are said to be orthogonal if $\left\langle x, x^{\prime} \right\rangle = x^{\prime} x = 0$. For any subsets $A \subseteq X$ and $S^{\prime} \subseteq X^{\prime}$, let
$$A^{\circ} = \left\{ x^{\prime} \in X^{\prime} : \sup_{a \in A} \left|x^{\prime}(a)\right| \leq 1 \right\} \qquad \text{ and } \qquad S^{\circ} = \left\{ x \in X : \sup_{s^{\prime} \in S^{\prime}} \left|s^{\prime}(x)\right| \leq 1 \right\}$$
denote the (absolute) polar of $A$ in $X^{\prime}$ (resp. of $S^{\prime}$ in $X$).

- If $A \subseteq X$ and $B \subseteq Y$ are convex, weakly closed sets containing the origin then ${}^\text{t}\! u\left(B^{\circ}\right) \subseteq A^{\circ}$ implies $u(A) \subseteq B$.
- If $A \subseteq X$ and $B \subseteq Y$ then

$$[u(A)]^{\circ} = \left({}^\text{t}\! u\right)^{-1}\left(A^{\circ}\right)$$
and
$$u(A) \subseteq B \quad \text{ implies } \quad {}^\text{t}\! u\left(B^{\circ}\right) \subseteq A^{\circ}.$$

- If $X$ and $Y$ are locally convex then

$$\operatorname{ker} {}^\text{t}\! u = \left(\operatorname{Im} u\right)^{\circ}.$$

=== Annihilators ===
Suppose $X$ and $Y$ are topological vector spaces and $u : X \to Y$ is a weakly continuous linear operator (so $\left({}^\text{t}\! u\right)\left(Y^{\prime}\right) \subseteq X^{\prime}$). Given subsets $M \subseteq X$ and $N \subseteq X^{\prime}$, define their annihilators (with respect to the canonical dual system) by

$$\begin{alignat}{4}
M^{\bot} :&= \left\{ x^{\prime} \in X^{\prime} : \left\langle m, x^{\prime} \right\rangle = 0 \text{ for all } m \in M \right\} \\
&= \left\{ x^{\prime} \in X^{\prime} : x^{\prime}(M) = \{0\} \right\} \qquad \text{ where } x^{\prime}(M) := \left\{ x^{\prime}(m) : m \in M \right\}
\end{alignat}$$

and

$$\begin{alignat}{4}
{}^{\bot} N :&= \left\{ x \in X : \left\langle x, n^{\prime} \right\rangle = 0 \text{ for all } n^{\prime} \in N \right\} \\
&= \left\{ x \in X : N(x) = \{ 0 \} \right\} \qquad \text{ where } N(x) := \left\{ n^{\prime}(x) : n^{\prime} \in N \right\} \\
\end{alignat}$$

- The kernel of ${}^\text{t}\! u$ is the subspace of $Y^{\prime}$ orthogonal to the image of $u$:

$$\ker {}^\text{t}\! u = (\operatorname{Im} u)^{\bot}$$

- The linear map $u$ is injective if and only if its image is a weakly dense subset of $Y$ (that is, the image of $u$ is dense in $Y$ when $Y$ is given the weak topology induced by $\operatorname{ker} {}^\text{t}\! u$).
- The transpose ${}^\text{t}\! u : Y^{\prime} \to X^{\prime}$ is continuous when both $X^{\prime}$ and $Y^{\prime}$ are endowed with the weak-* topology (resp. both endowed with the strong dual topology, both endowed with the topology of uniform convergence on compact convex subsets, both endowed with the topology of uniform convergence on compact subsets).
- (Surjection of Fréchet spaces): If $X$ and $Y$ are Fréchet spaces then the continuous linear operator $u : X \to Y$ is surjective if and only if (1) the transpose ${}^\text{t}\! u : Y^{\prime} \to X^{\prime}$ is injective, and (2) the image of the transpose of $u$ is a weakly closed (i.e. weak-* closed) subset of $X^{\prime}$.

=== Duals of quotient spaces ===
Let $M$ be a closed vector subspace of a Hausdorff locally convex space $X$ and denote the canonical quotient map by
$$\pi : X \to X / M \quad \text{ where } \quad \pi(x) := x + M.$$
Assume $X / M$ is endowed with the quotient topology induced by the quotient map $\pi : X \to X / M$. Then the transpose of the quotient map is valued in $M^{\bot}$ and
$${}^\text{t}\! \pi : (X / M)^{\prime} \to M^{\bot} \subseteq X^{\prime}$$
is a TVS-isomorphism onto $M^{\bot}$. If $X$ is a Banach space then ${}^\text{t}\! \pi : (X / M)^{\prime} \to M^{\bot}$ is also an isometry. Using this transpose, every continuous linear functional on the quotient space $X / M$ is canonically identified with a continuous linear functional in the annihilator $M^{\bot}$ of $M$.

=== Duals of vector subspaces ===
Let $M$ be a closed vector subspace of a Hausdorff locally convex space $X$. If $m^{\prime} \in M^{\prime}$ and if $x^{\prime} \in X^{\prime}$ is a continuous linear extension of $m^{\prime}$ to $X$ then the assignment $m^{\prime} \mapsto x^{\prime} + M^{\bot}$ induces a vector space isomorphism
$$M^{\prime} \to X^{\prime} / \left(M^{\bot}\right),$$
which is an isometry if $X$ is a Banach space.

Denote the inclusion map by
$$\operatorname{In} : M \to X \quad \text{ where } \quad \operatorname{In}(m) := m \quad \text{ for all } m \in M.$$
The transpose of the inclusion map is
$${}^\text{t}\! \operatorname{In} : X^{\prime} \to M^{\prime}$$
whose kernel is the annihilator $M^{\bot} = \left\{ x^{\prime} \in X^{\prime} : \left\langle m, x^{\prime} \right\rangle = 0 \text{ for all } m \in M \right\}$ and which is surjective by the Hahn–Banach theorem. This map induces an isomorphism of vector spaces
$$X^{\prime} / \left(M^{\bot}\right) \to M^{\prime}.$$

== Representation as a matrix ==
If the linear map $u$ is represented by the matrix $A$ with respect to two bases of $X$ and $Y$, then ${}^\text{t}\! u$ is represented by the transpose matrix $A^\text{T}$ with respect to the dual bases of $Y^{\prime}$ and $X^{\prime}$, hence the name. Alternatively, as $u$ is represented by $A$ acting to the right on column vectors, ${}^\text{t}\! u$ is represented by the same matrix acting to the left on row vectors. These points of view are related by the canonical inner product on $\R^n$, which identifies the space of column vectors with the dual space of row vectors.

== Relation to the Hermitian adjoint ==
The identity that characterizes the transpose, that is, ${{{1}}}$, is formally similar to the definition of the Hermitian adjoint, however, the transpose and the Hermitian adjoint are not the same map. The transpose is a map $Y^{\prime} \to X^{\prime}$ and is defined for linear maps between any vector spaces $X$ and $Y$, without requiring any additional structure. The Hermitian adjoint maps $Y \to X$ and is only defined for linear maps between Hilbert spaces, as it is defined in terms of the inner product on the Hilbert space. The Hermitian adjoint therefore requires more mathematical structure than the transpose.

However, the transpose is often used in contexts where the vector spaces are both equipped with a nondegenerate bilinear form such as the Euclidean dot product or another real inner product. In this case, the nondegenerate bilinear form is often used implicitly to map between the vector spaces and their duals, to express the transposed map as a map $Y \to X$. For a complex Hilbert space, the inner product is sesquilinear and not bilinear, and these conversions change the transpose into the adjoint map.

More precisely: if $X$ and $Y$ are Hilbert spaces and $u : X \to Y$ is a linear map then the transpose of $u$ and the Hermitian adjoint of $u$, which we will denote respectively by ${}^\text{t}\! u$ and $u^{*}$, are related. Denote by $I : X \to X^{*}$ and $J : Y \to Y^{*}$ the canonical antilinear isometries of the Hilbert spaces $X$ and $Y$ onto their duals. Then $u^{*}$ is the following composition of maps:

$$Y \overset{J}{\longrightarrow} Y^* \overset{{}^{\text{t}\!}u}{\longrightarrow} X^* \overset{I^{-1}}{\longrightarrow} X$$

== Applications to functional analysis ==
Suppose that $X$ and $Y$ are topological vector spaces and that $u : X \to Y$ is a linear map, then many of $u$'s properties are reflected in ${}^\text{t}\! u$.

- If $A \subseteq X$ and $B \subseteq Y$ are weakly closed, convex sets containing the origin, then ${}^\text{t}\! u(B^{\circ}) \subseteq A^{\circ}$ implies $u(A) \subseteq B$.
- The null space of ${}^\text{t}\! u$ is the subspace of $Y^{\prime}$ orthogonal to the range $u(X)$ of $u$.
- ${}^\text{t}\! u$ is injective if and only if the range $u(X)$ of $u$ is weakly closed.

== See also ==
- Adjoint functors – Relationship between two functors abstracting many common constructions
- Composition operator – Linear operator in mathematics
- Hermitian adjoint – Conjugate transpose of an operator in infinite dimensions
- Riesz representation theorem – Theorem about the dual of a Hilbert space
- Dual space § Transpose of a linear map
- Transpose § Transpose of a linear map

== Bibliography ==
- Halmos, Paul (1974), Finite-dimensional Vector Spaces, Springer, ISBN 0-387-90093-4
- Rudin, Walter (1991). Functional Analysis. International Series in Pure and Applied Mathematics. Vol. 8 (Second ed.). New York, NY: McGraw-Hill Science/Engineering/Math. ISBN 978-0-07-054236-5. OCLC 21163277.
- Schaefer, Helmut H.; Wolff, Manfred P. (1999). Topological Vector Spaces. GTM. Vol. 8 (Second ed.). New York, NY: Springer New York Imprint Springer. ISBN 978-1-4612-7155-0. OCLC 840278135.
- Trèves, François (2006) [1967]. Topological Vector Spaces, Distributions and Kernels. Mineola, N.Y.: Dover Publications. ISBN 978-0-486-45352-1. OCLC 853623322.
