= Conjugate transpose =

Complex matrix A* obtained from a matrix A by transposing it and conjugating each entry

In mathematics, the conjugate transpose, also known as the Hermitian transpose, of a $m \times n$ complex matrix $\mathbf{A}$ is a $n \times m$ matrix obtained by transposing $\mathbf{A}$ and applying complex conjugation to each entry (the complex conjugate of $a+ib$ being $a-ib$, for real numbers $a$ and $b$). There are several notations, such as $\mathbf{A}^\mathrm{H}$ or $\mathbf{A}^*$, $\mathbf{A}'$, or (often in physics) $\mathbf{A}^{\dagger}$.

For real matrices, the conjugate transpose is just the transpose, $\mathbf{A}^\mathrm{H} = \mathbf{A}^\operatorname{T}$.

== Definition ==
The conjugate transpose of a $m \times n$ matrix $\mathbf{A}$ is formally defined by

$\left(\mathbf{A}^\mathrm{H}\right)_{ij} = \overline{\mathbf{A}_{ji}}$	Eq.1

where the subscript $ij$ denotes the $(i,j)$-th entry (matrix element), for $1 \le i \le n$ and $1 \le j \le m$, and the overbar denotes a scalar complex conjugate.

This definition can also be written as

$$\mathbf{A}^\mathrm{H} = \left(\overline{\mathbf{A}}\right)^\operatorname{T} = \overline{\mathbf{A}^\operatorname{T}}$$

where $\mathbf{A}^\operatorname{T}$ denotes the transpose and $\overline{\mathbf{A}}$ denotes the matrix with complex conjugated entries.

Other names for the conjugate transpose of a matrix are Hermitian transpose, Hermitian conjugate, adjoint matrix or transjugate. The conjugate transpose of a matrix $\mathbf{A}$ can be denoted by any of these symbols:

- $\mathbf{A}^*$, commonly used in linear algebra
- $\mathbf{A}^\mathrm{H}$, commonly used in linear algebra
- $\mathbf{A}^\dagger$ (sometimes pronounced as A dagger), commonly used in quantum mechanics
- $\mathbf{A}^+$, although this symbol is more commonly used for the Moore–Penrose pseudoinverse

In some contexts, $\mathbf{A}^*$ denotes the matrix with only complex conjugated entries and no transposition.

== Example ==
Suppose we want to calculate the conjugate transpose of the following matrix $\mathbf{A}$.

$$\mathbf{A} = \begin{bmatrix} 1 & -2 - i & 5 \\ 1 + i & i & 4-2i \end{bmatrix}$$

We first transpose the matrix:

$$\mathbf{A}^\operatorname{T} = \begin{bmatrix} 1 & 1 + i \\ -2 - i & i \\ 5 & 4-2i\end{bmatrix}$$

Then we conjugate every entry of the matrix:

$$\mathbf{A}^\mathrm{H} = \begin{bmatrix} 1 & 1 - i \\ -2 + i & -i \\ 5 & 4+2i\end{bmatrix}$$

== Basic remarks ==
A square matrix $\mathbf{A}$ with entries $a_{ij}$ is called

- Hermitian or self-adjoint if $\mathbf{A}=\mathbf{A}^\mathrm{H}$; i.e., $a_{ij} = \overline{a_{ji}}$.
- Skew Hermitian or antihermitian if $\mathbf{A}=-\mathbf{A}^\mathrm{H}$; i.e., $a_{ij} = -\overline{a_{ji}}$.
- Normal if $\mathbf{A}^\mathrm{H} \mathbf{A} = \mathbf{A} \mathbf{A}^\mathrm{H}$.
- Unitary if $\mathbf{A}^\mathrm{H} = \mathbf{A}^{-1}$, equivalently $\mathbf{A}\mathbf{A}^\mathrm{H} = \boldsymbol{I}$, equivalently $\mathbf{A}^\mathrm{H}\mathbf{A} = \boldsymbol{I}$.

Even if $\mathbf{A}$ is not square, the two matrices $\mathbf{A}^\mathrm{H}\mathbf{A}$ and $\mathbf{A}\mathbf{A}^\mathrm{H}$ are both Hermitian and in fact positive semi-definite matrices.

The conjugate transpose "adjoint" matrix $\mathbf{A}^\mathrm{H}$ should not be confused with the adjugate, $\operatorname{adj}(\mathbf{A})$, which is also sometimes called adjoint.

The conjugate transpose can be motivated by noting that complex numbers can be usefully represented by $2 \times 2$ real matrices, obeying matrix addition and multiplication:
$$a + ib \equiv \begin{bmatrix} a & -b \\ b & a \end{bmatrix}.$$

That is, denoting each complex number $z$ by the real $2 \times 2$ matrix of the linear transformation on the Argand diagram (viewed as the real vector space $\mathbb{R}^2$), affected by complex $z$-multiplication on $\mathbb{C}$.

Thus, an $m \times n$ matrix of complex numbers could be well represented by a $2m \times 2n$ matrix of real numbers. The conjugate transpose, therefore, arises very naturally as the result of simply transposing such a matrix—when viewed back again as an $n \times m$ matrix made up of complex numbers.

For an explanation of the notation used here, we begin by representing complex numbers $e^{i\theta}$ as the rotation matrix, that is,
$$e^{i\theta} = \begin{pmatrix} \cos \theta & -\sin \theta \\ \sin \theta & \cos \theta \end{pmatrix} = \cos \theta \begin{pmatrix} 1 & 0 \\ 0 & 1 \end{pmatrix} + \sin \theta \begin{pmatrix} 0 & -1 \\ 1 & 0 \end{pmatrix}.$$
Since $e^{i\theta} = \cos \theta + i \sin \theta$, we are led to the matrix representations of the unit numbers as
$$1 = \begin{pmatrix} 1 & 0 \\ 0 & 1 \end{pmatrix}, \quad i = \begin{pmatrix} 0 & -1 \\ 1 & 0 \end{pmatrix}.$$

A general complex number $z=x+iy$ is then represented as
$$z = \begin{pmatrix} x & -y \\ y & x \end{pmatrix}.$$
The complex conjugate operation (that sends $a + bi$ to $a - bi$ for real $a, b$) is encoded as the matrix transpose.

== Properties ==
- $(\mathbf{A} + \boldsymbol{B})^\mathrm{H} = \mathbf{A}^\mathrm{H} + \boldsymbol{B}^\mathrm{H}$ for any two matrices $\mathbf{A}$ and $\boldsymbol{B}$ of the same dimensions.
- $(z\mathbf{A})^\mathrm{H} = \overline{z} \mathbf{A}^\mathrm{H}$ for any complex number $z$ and any $m \times n$ matrix $\mathbf{A}$.
- $(\mathbf{A}\boldsymbol{B})^\mathrm{H} = \boldsymbol{B}^\mathrm{H} \mathbf{A}^\mathrm{H}$ for any $m \times n$ matrix $\mathbf{A}$ and any $n \times p$ matrix $\boldsymbol{B}$. Note that the order of the factors is reversed.
- $\left(\mathbf{A}^\mathrm{H}\right)^\mathrm{H} = \mathbf{A}$ for any $m \times n$ matrix $\mathbf{A}$, i.e. Hermitian transposition is an involution.
- If $\mathbf{A}$ is a square matrix, then $\det\left(\mathbf{A}^\mathrm{H}\right) = \overline{\det\left(\mathbf{A}\right)}$ where $\operatorname{det}(A)$ denotes the determinant of $\mathbf{A}$ .
- If $\mathbf{A}$ is a square matrix, then $\operatorname{tr}\left(\mathbf{A}^\mathrm{H}\right) = \overline{\operatorname{tr}(\mathbf{A})}$ where $\operatorname{tr}(A)$ denotes the trace of $\mathbf{A}$.
- $\mathbf{A}$ is invertible if and only if $\mathbf{A}^\mathrm{H}$ is invertible, and in that case $\left(\mathbf{A}^\mathrm{H}\right)^{-1} = \left(\mathbf{A}^{-1}\right)^{\mathrm{H}}$.
- The eigenvalues of $\mathbf{A}^\mathrm{H}$ are the complex conjugates of the eigenvalues of $\mathbf{A}$.
- $\left\langle \mathbf{A} x,y \right\rangle_m = \left\langle x, \mathbf{A}^\mathrm{H} y\right\rangle_n$ for any $m \times n$ matrix $\mathbf{A}$, any vector in $x \in \mathbb{C}^n$ and any vector $y \in \mathbb{C}^m$. Here, $\langle\cdot,\cdot\rangle_m$ denotes the standard complex inner product on $\mathbb{C}^m$, and similarly for $\langle\cdot,\cdot\rangle_n$.

== Generalizations ==
The last property given above shows that if one views $\mathbf{A}$ as a linear transformation from Hilbert space $\mathbb{C}^n$ to $\mathbb{C}^m ,$ then the matrix $\mathbf{A}^\mathrm{H}$ corresponds to the adjoint operator of $\mathbf A$. The concept of adjoint operators between Hilbert spaces can thus be seen as a generalization of the conjugate transpose of matrices with respect to an orthonormal basis.

Another generalization is available: suppose $A$ is a linear map from a complex vector space $V$ to another, $W$, then the complex conjugate linear map as well as the transposed linear map are defined, and we may thus take the conjugate transpose of $A$ to be the complex conjugate of the transpose of $A$. It maps the conjugate dual of $W$ to the conjugate dual of $V$.

== See also ==
- Complex dot product
- Hermitian adjoint
- Adjugate matrix
