= Complex conjugate of a vector space =

Mathematics concept

In mathematics, the complex conjugate of a complex vector space $V\,$ is a complex vector space $\overline V$ that has the same elements and additive group structure as $V,$ but whose scalar multiplication involves conjugation of the scalars. In other words, the scalar multiplication of $\overline V$ satisfies
$$\alpha\,*\, v = {\,\overline{\alpha} \cdot \,v\,}$$
where $*$ is the scalar multiplication of $\overline{V}$ and $\cdot$ is the scalar multiplication of $V.$ The letter $v$ stands for a vector in $V,$ $\alpha$ is a complex number, and $\overline{\alpha}$ denotes the complex conjugate of $\alpha.$

More concretely, the complex conjugate vector space is the same underlying real vector space (same set of points, same vector addition and real scalar multiplication) with the conjugate linear complex structure $J$ (different multiplication by $i$).

== Motivation ==
If $V$ and $W$ are complex vector spaces, a function $f : V \to W$ is antilinear if
$$f(v + w) = f(v) + f(w) \quad \text{ and } \quad f(\alpha v) = \overline{\alpha} \, f(v)$$
With the use of the conjugate vector space $\overline V$, an antilinear map $f : V \to W$ can be regarded as an ordinary linear map of type $\overline{V} \to W.$ The linearity is checked by noting:
$$f(\alpha * v) = f(\overline{\alpha} \cdot v) =  \overline{\overline{\alpha}} \cdot f(v) = \alpha \cdot f(v)$$
Conversely, any linear map defined on $\overline{V}$ gives rise to an antilinear map on $V.$

This is the same underlying principle as in defining the opposite ring so that a right $R$-module can be regarded as a left $R^{op}$-module, or that of an opposite category so that a contravariant functor $C \to D$ can be regarded as an ordinary functor of type $C^{op} \to D.$

== Complex conjugation functor ==
A linear map $f : V \to W\,$ gives rise to a corresponding linear map $\overline{f} : \overline{V} \to \overline{W}$ that has the same action as $f.$ Note that $\overline f$ preserves scalar multiplication because
$$\overline{f}(\alpha * v) = f(\overline{\alpha} \cdot v) = \overline{\alpha} \cdot f(v) = \alpha * \overline{f}(v)$$
Thus, complex conjugation $V \mapsto \overline{V}$ and $f \mapsto\overline f$ define a functor from the category of complex vector spaces to itself.

If $V$ and $W$ are finite-dimensional and the map $f$ is described by the complex matrix $A$ with respect to the bases $\mathcal{B}$ of $V$ and $\mathcal{C}$ of $W,$ then the map $\overline{f}$ is described by the complex conjugate of $A$ with respect to the bases $\overline{\mathcal{B}}$ of $\overline{V}$ and $\overline{\mathcal{C}}$ of $\overline{W}.$

== Structure of the conjugate ==
The vector spaces $V$ and $\overline{V}$ have the same dimension over the complex numbers and are therefore isomorphic as complex vector spaces. However, there is no natural isomorphism from $V$ to $\overline{V}.$

The double conjugate $\overline{\overline{V}}$ is identical to $V.$

== Complex conjugate of a Hilbert space ==
Given a Hilbert space $\mathcal{H}$ (either finite or infinite dimensional), its complex conjugate $\overline{\mathcal{H}}$ is the same vector space as its continuous dual space $\mathcal{H}^{\prime}.$ There is one-to-one antilinear correspondence between continuous linear functionals and vectors. In other words, any continuous linear functional on $\mathcal{H}$ is an inner multiplication to some fixed vector, and vice versa.

Thus, the complex conjugate to a vector $v,$ particularly in finite dimension case, may be denoted as $v^\dagger$ (v-dagger, a row vector that is the conjugate transpose to a column vector $v$). In quantum mechanics, the conjugate to a ket vector $\,|\psi\rangle$ is denoted as $\langle\psi|\,$ – a bra vector (see bra–ket notation).

== See also ==
- Antidual space – Conjugate homogeneous additive map
- Linear complex structure – Mathematics concept
- Riesz representation theorem – Theorem about the dual of a Hilbert space
- conjugate bundle
