= Glossary of representation theory =

This is a glossary of representation theory in mathematics.

The term "module" is often used synonymously for a representation; for the module-theoretic terminology, see also glossary of module theory.

See also Glossary of Lie groups and Lie algebras, list of representation theory topics and Category:Representation theory.

Notations: We write $\mathbb{G}_m = GL_1$. Thus, for example, a one-representation (i.e., a character) of a group G is of the form $\chi: G \to \mathbb{G}_m$.

== A ==
Adams
Adams operations.
adjoint
The adjoint representation of a Lie group G is the representation given by the adjoint action of G on the Lie algebra of G (an adjoint action is obtained, roughly, by differentiating a conjugation action.)
admissible
A representation of a real reductive group is called admissible if (1) a maximal compact subgroup K acts as unitary operators and (2) each irreducible representation of K has finite multiplicity.
alternating
The alternating square of a representation V is a subrepresentation $\operatorname{Alt}^2(V)$ of the second tensor power $V^{\otimes 2}=V\otimes V$.
Artin
1. Emil Artin.
2. Artin's theorem on induced characters states that a character on a finite group is a rational linear combination of characters induced from cyclic subgroups.
3. Artin representation is used in the definition of the Artin conductor.
automorphic
automorphic representation

== B ==
Borel–Weil–Bott theorem
Over an algebraically closed field of characteristic zero, the Borel–Weil–Bott theorem realizes an irreducible representation of a reductive algebraic group as the space of the global sections of a line bundle on a flag variety. (In the positive characteristic case, the construction only produces Weyl modules, which may not be irreducible.)
branching
branching rule
Brauer
Brauer's theorem on induced characters states that a character on a finite group is a linear combination with integer coefficients of characters induced from elementary subgroups.

== C ==
Cartan–Weyl theory
Another name for the representation theory of semisimple Lie algebras.
Casimir element
A Casimir element is a distinguished element of the center of the universal enveloping algebra of a Lie algebra.
category of representations
Representations and equivariant maps between them form a category of representations.
character
1. A character is a one-dimensional representation.
2. The character of a finite-dimensional representation π is the function $g \mapsto \operatorname{tr} \pi(g)$. In other words, it is the composition $G \overset{\pi}\to GL(V) \overset{\operatorname{tr}}\to \mathbb{G}_m$.
3. An irreducible character (resp. a trivial character) is the character of an irreducible representation (resp. a trivial representation).
4. The character group of a group G is the group of all characters on G; namely, $\operatorname{Hom}(G, \mathbb{G}_m)$.
5. The character ring is the group ring (over the integers) of the character group of G.
6. A virtual character is an element of a character ring.
7. A distributional character may be defined for an infinite-dimensional representation.
8. An infinitesimal character.
Chevalley
1. Chevalley
2. Chevalley generators
3. Chevalley group.
4. Chevalley's restriction theorem.
class function
A class function f on a group G is a function such that $f(g) = f(h g h^{-1})$; it is a function on conjugacy classes.
cluster algebra
A cluster algebra is an integral domain with some combinatorial structure on the generators, introduced in an attempt to systematize the notion of a dual canonical basis.
coadjoint
A coadjoint representation is the dual representation of an adjoint representation.
complete
“completely reducible" is another term for "semisimple".
complex
1. A complex representation is a representation of G on a complex vector space. Many authors refer complex representations simply as representations.
2. The complex-conjugate $\overline{V}$ of a complex representation V is the representation with the same underlying additive group V with the linear action of G but with the action of a complex number through complex conjugation.
3. A complex representation is self-conjugate if it is isomorphic to its complex conjugate.
complementary
A complementary representation to a subrepresentation W of a representation V is a representation W' such that V is the direct sum of W and W'.
cuspidal
cuspidal representation
crystal
crystal basis
cyclic
A cyclic G-module is a G-module generated by a single vector. For example, an irreducible representation is necessarily cyclic.

== D ==
Dedekind
Dedekind's theorem on linear independence of characters.
defined over
Given a field extension $K/F$, a representation V of a group G over K is said to be defined over F if $V \simeq V_0 \otimes_F K$ for some representation $V_0$ over F such that $g: V \to V$ is induced by $g: V_0 \to V_0$; i.e., $g \cdot (v \otimes \lambda) = g v \otimes \lambda$. Here, $V_0$ is called an F-form of V (and is not necessarily unique).
Demazure
Demazure's character formula
direct sum
The direct sum of representations V, W is a representation that is the direct sum $V \oplus W$ of the vector spaces together with the linear group action $\pi_{V \oplus W}(g)(v + w) = \pi_V(g)v + \pi_W(g)w$.
discrete
An irreducible representation of a Lie group G is said to be in the discrete series if the matrix coefficients of it are all square integrable. For example, if G is compact, then every irreducible representation of it is in the discrete series.
dominant
The irreducible representations of a simply-connected compact Lie group are indexed by their highest weight. These dominant weights form the lattice points in an orthant in the weight lattice of the Lie group.
dual
1. The dual representation (or the contragredient representation) of a representation V is a representation that is the dual vector space $V^* = \operatorname{Hom}(V, k)$ together with the linear group action that preserves the natural pairing $V^* \times V \to k$
2. A dual canonical basis is a dual of Lusztig's canonical basis.

== E ==
Eisenstein
Eisenstein series
equivariant
The term “G-equivariant” is another term for “G-linear”.
exterior
An exterior power of a representation V is a representation $\wedge^n(V)$ with the group action induced by $V^{\otimes n} \to \wedge^n(V)$.

== F ==
faithful
A faithful representation $\pi: G \to GL(V)$ is a representation such that $\pi$ is injective as a function.
fiber functor
fiber functor.
Frobenius reciprocity
The Frobenius reciprocity states that for each representation $\sigma$ of H and representation $\pi$ of G there is a bijection

$$\operatorname{Hom}_G(\pi, \operatorname{Ind}_H^G \sigma) = \operatorname{Hom}_H(\pi|_H, \sigma)$$

that is natural in the sense that $\operatorname{Ind}_H^G$ is the right adjoint functor to the restriction functor $\pi \mapsto \pi|_H$.
fundamental
Fundamental representation: For the irreducible representations of a simply-connected compact Lie group there exists a set of fundamental weights, indexed by the vertices of the Dynkin diagram of G, such that dominant weights are simply non-negative integer linear combinations of the fundamental weights. The corresponding irreducible representations are the fundamental representations of the Lie group. In particular, from the expansion of a dominant weight in terms of the fundamental weights, one can take a corresponding tensor product of the fundamental representations and extract one copy of the irreducible representation corresponding to that dominant weight. In the case of the special unitary group SU(n), the n − 1 fundamental representations are the wedge products

$$Alt^k\ {\mathbb C}^n$$

consisting of alternating tensors, for k=1,2,...,n-1.

== G ==
G-linear
A G-linear map $f: V \to W$ between representations is a linear transformation that commutes with the G-actions; i.e., $f \circ \pi_V(g) = \pi_W(g) \circ f$ for every g in G.
G-module
Another name for a representation. It allows for the module-theoretic terminology: e.g., trivial G-module, G-submodules, etc.
G-equivariant vector bundle
A G-equivariant vector bundle is a vector bundle $p: E \to X$ on a G-space X together with a G-action on E (say right) such that $g: p^{-1}(x) \to p^{-1}(xg)$ is a well-defined linear map.
Galois
Galois representation.
good
A good filtration of a representation of a reductive group G is a filtration such that the quotients are isomorphic to $H^0(\lambda) = \Gamma(G/B, L_\lambda)$ where $L_\lambda$ are the line bundles on the flag variety $G/B$.

== H ==
Harish-Chandra
1. Harish-Chandra (11 October 1923 – 16 October 1983), an Indian American mathematician.
2. The Harish-Chandra Plancherel theorem.
highest weight
1. Given a complex semisimple Lie algebra $\mathfrak{g}$, Cartan subalgebra $\mathfrak{h}$ and a choice of a positive Weyl chamber, the highest weight of a representation of $\mathfrak{g}$ is the weight of an $\mathfrak{h}$-weight vector v such that $E_{\alpha} v = 0$ for every positive root $\alpha$ (v is called the highest weight vector).
2. The theorem of the highest weight states (1) two finite-dimensional irreducible representations of $\mathfrak{g}$ are isomorphic if and only if they have the same highest weight and (2) for each dominant integral $\lambda \in \mathfrak{h}^*$, there is a finite-dimensional irreducible representation having $\lambda$ as its highest weight.
Hom
The Hom representation $\operatorname{Hom}(V, W)$ of representations V, W is a representation with the group action obtained by the vector space identification $\operatorname{Hom}(V, W) = V^* \otimes W$.

== I ==
indecomposable
An indecomposable representation is a representation that is not a direct sum of at least two proper subrepresebtations.
induction
1. Given a representation $(\sigma, W)$ of a subgroup H of a group G, the induced representation

$$\operatorname{Ind}_H^G(\sigma) = \{ f: G \to W | f(hg) = \sigma(h) f(g) \}$$

is a representation of G that is induced on the H-linear functions $f: G \to W$; cf. #Frobenius reciprocity.
2. Depending on applications, it is common to impose further conditions on the functions $f: G \to W$; for example, if the functions are required to be compactly supported, then the resulting induction is called the compact induction.
infinitesimally
Two admissible representations of a real reductive group are said to be infinitesimally equivalent if their associated Lie algebra representations on the space of K-finite vectors are isomorphic.
integrable
A representation of a Kac–Moody algebra is said to be integrable if (1) it is a sum of weight spaces and (2) Chevalley generators $e_i, f_i$ are locally nilpotent.
intertwining
The term "intertwining operator" is an old name for a G-linear map between representations.
involution
An involution representation is a representation of a C*-algebra on a Hilbert space that preserves involution.
irreducible
An irreducible representation is a representation whose only subrepresentations are zero and itself. The term "irreducible" is synonymous with "simple".
isomorphism
An isomorphism between representations of a group G is an invertible G-linear map between the representations.
isotypic
1. Given a representation V and a simple representation W (subrepresebtation or otherwise), the isotypic component of V of type W is the direct sum of all subrepresentations of V that are isomorphic to W. For example, let A be a ring and G a group acting on it as automorphisms. If A is semisimple as a G-module, then the ring of invariants $A^G$ is the isotypic component of A of trivial type.
2. The isotypic decomposition of a semisimple representation is the decomposition into the isotypic components.

== J ==
Jacquet
Jacquet functor

== K ==
Kac
The Kac character formula
K-finite
A vector v in a representation space of a group K is said to be K-finite if $K \cdot v$ spans a finite-dimensional vector space.
Kirillov
The Kirillov character formula

== L ==
lattice
1. The root lattice is the free abelian group generated by the roots.
2. The weight lattice is the group of all linear functionals $\chi \in \mathfrak{h}^*$ on a Cartan subalgebra $\mathfrak{h}$ that are integral: $\chi(H_{\alpha})$ is an integer for every root $\alpha$.
Littlemann
Littelmann path model

== M ==
Maschke's theorem
Maschke's theorem states that a finite-dimensional representation over a field F of a finite group G is a semisimple representation if the characteristic of F does not divide the order of G.
Mackey theory
The Mackey theory may be thought of a tool to answer the question: given a representation W of a subgroup H of a group G, when is the induced representation $\operatorname{Ind}_H^G W$ an irreducible representation of G?
Maass–Selberg
Maass–Selberg relations.
matrix coefficient
A matrix coefficient of a representation $\pi: G \to GL(V)$ is a linear combination of functions on G of the form $g \mapsto \langle \pi(g) v, \alpha \rangle$ for v in V and $\alpha$ in the dual space $V^*$. Note the notion makes sense for any group: if G is a topological group and $\pi$ is continuous, then a matrix matrix coefficient would be a continuous function on G. If G and $\pi$ are algebraic, it would be a regular function on G.
modular
The modular representation theory.
Molien
Given a finite-dimensional complex representation V of a finite group G, Molien's theorem says that the series $\sum_{n = 0}^{\infty} \dim (\mathbb{C}[V]^G)_n t^n$, where $(\mathbb{C}[V]^G)_n$ denotes the space of $G$-invariant homogeneous polynomials on V of degree n, coincides with $(\# G)^{-1} \sum_{g \in G} \det(1 - t g |V)^{-1}$. The theorem is also valid for a reductive group by replacing $(\# G)^{-1} \sum_{g \in G}$ by integration over a maximal compact subgroup.

== O ==
Oscillator
Oscillator representation
orbit
orbit method, an approach to representation theory that uses tools from symplectic geometry

== P ==
Peter–Weyl
The Peter–Weyl theorem states that the linear span of the matrix coefficients on a compact group G is dense in $L^2(G)$.
permutation
Given a group G, a G-set X and V the vector space of functions from X to a fixed field, a permutation representation $\pi$ of G on V is a representation given by the induced action of G on V; i.e., $(\pi(g)v)(x) = v(g^{-1} x)$. For example, if X is a finite set and V is viewed as a vector space with a basis parameteized by X, then the symmetric group $G = \operatorname{Sym}(X)$ permutates the elements of the basis and its linear extension is precisely the permutation representation.
Plancherel
Plancherel formula
positive-energy representation
positive-energy representation.
primitive
The term "primitive element" (or a vector) is an old term for a Borel-weight vector.
projective
A projective representation of a group G is a group homomorphism $\pi: G \to PGL(V) = GL(V)/\mathbb{G}_m$. Since $PGL(V) = \operatorname{Aut}(\mathbb{P}(V))$, a projective representation is precisely a group action of G on $\mathbb{P}(V)$ as automorphisms.
proper
A proper subrepresentation of a representation V is a subrepresentstion that is not V.

== Q ==
quotient
Given a representation V and a subrepresentation $W \subset V$, the quotient representation is the representation $(\pi_{V/W}, V/W)$ given by $\pi_{V/W}(g): V/W \to V/W, \, v + W \mapsto gv + W$.
quaternionic
A quaternionic representation of a group G is a complex representation equipped with a G-invariant quaternionic structure.
quiver
A quiver, by definition, is a directed graph. But one typically studies representations of a quiver.

== R ==
rational
A representation V is rational if each vector v in V is contained in some finite-dimensional subrepresentation (depending on v.)
real
1. A real representation of a vector space is a representation on a real vector space.
2. A real character is a character $\chi$ of a group G such that $\chi(g)\in\mathbb{R}$ for all g in G.
regular
1. A regular representation of a finite group G is the induced representation of G on the group algebra over a field of G.
2. A regular representation of a linear algebraic group G is the induced representation on the coordinate ring of G. See also: representation on coordinate rings.
representation
1.

Representation theory is simple to define: it is the study of the ways in which a given group may act on vector spaces. It is almost certainly unique, however, among such clearly delineated subjects, in the breadth of its interest to mathematicians. This is not surprising: group actions are ubiquitous in 20th century mathematics, and where the object on which a group acts is not a vector space, we have learned to replace it by one that is (e.g., a cohomology group, tangent space, etc.). As a consequence, many mathematicians other than specialists in the field (or even those who think they might want to be) come in contact with the subject in various ways.

— Fulton, William; Harris, Joe, Representation Theory: A First Course
A linear representation of a group G is a group homomorphism $\pi: G \to GL(V)$ from G to the general linear group $GL(V)$. Depending on the group G, the homomorphism $\pi$ is often implicitly required to be a morphishm in a category to which G belongs; e.g., if G is a topological group, then $\pi$ must be continuous. The adjective “linear” is often omitted.
2. Equivalently, a linear representation is a group action of G on a vector space V that is linear: the action $\sigma: G \times V \to V$ such that for each g in G, $\sigma_g: V \to V, v \mapsto \sigma(g, v)$ is a linear transformation.
3. A virtual representation is an element of the Grothendieck ring of the category of representations.
representative
The term "representative function" is another term for a matrix coefficient.

== S ==
Schur
1.

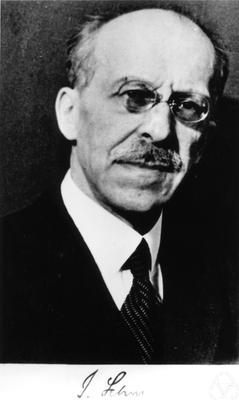
Issai Schur

Issai Schur
2. Schur's lemma states that a G-linear map between irreducible representations must be either bijective or zero.
3. The Schur orthogonality relations on a compact group says the characters of non-isomorphic irreducible representations are orthogonal to each other.
4. The Schur functor $V \mapsto S^{\lambda}(V)$ constructs representations such as symmetric powers or exterior powers according to a partition $\lambda$. The characters of $S^\lambda(V)$ are Schur polynomials.
5. The Schur–Weyl duality computes the irreducible representations occurring in tensor powers of $GL(V)$-modules.
6. A Schur polynomial is a symmetric function, of a type occurring in the Weyl character formula applied to unitary groups.
7. Schur index.
8. A Schur complex.
semisimple
A semisimple representation (also called a completely reducible representation) is a direct sum of simple representations.
simple
Another term for "irreducible".
smooth
1. A smooth representation of a locally profinite group G is a complex representation such that, for each v in V, there is some compact open subgroup K of G that fixes v; i.e., $g \cdot v = v$ for every g in K.
2. A smooth vector in a representation space of a Lie group is a vector v such that $g \mapsto g \cdot v$ is a smooth function.
Specht
Specht module
Steinberg
Steinberg representation.
subrepresentation
A subrepresentation of a representation $(\pi, V)$ of G is a vector subspace W of V such that $\pi(g): W \to W$ is well-defined for each g in G.
Swan
The Swan representation is used to define the Swan conductor.
symmetric
1. A symmetric power of a representation V is a representation $\operatorname{Sym}^n(V)$ with the group action induced by $V^{\otimes n} \to \operatorname{Sym}^n(V)$.
2. In particular, the symmetric square of a representation V is a representation $\operatorname{Sym}^2(V)$ with the group action induced by $V^{\otimes 2} \to \operatorname{Sym}^2(V)$.
system of imprimitivity
A concept in the Mackey theory. See system of imprimitivity.

== T ==
Tannakian duality
The Tannakian duality is roughly an idea that a group can be recovered from all of its representations.
tempered
tempered representation
tensor
A tensor representation is roughly a representation obtained from tensor products (of certain representations).
tensor product
The tensor product of representations V, W is the representation that is the tensor product of vector spaces $V \otimes W$ together with the linear group action $\pi_{V \otimes W}(g)(v \otimes w) = \pi_V(g) v \otimes \pi_W(g) w$.
trivial
1. A trivial representation of a group G is a representation π such that π(g) is the identity for every g in G.
2. A trivial character of a group G is a character that is trivial as a representation.

== U ==
uniformly bounded
A uniformly bounded representation of a locally compact group is a representation in the algebra of bounded operators that is continuous in strong operator topology and that is such that the norm of the operator given by each group element is uniformly bounded.
unitary
1. A unitary representation of a group G is a representation π such that π(g) is a unitary operator for every g in G.
2. A unitarizable representation is a representation equivalent to a unitary representation.

== V ==
Verma module
Given a complex semisimple Lie algebra $\mathfrak{g}$, a Cartan subalgebra $\mathfrak{h}$ and a choice of a positive Weyl chamber, the Verma module $M_{\chi}$ associated to a linear functional $\chi: \mathfrak{h} \to \mathbb{C}$ is the quotient of the enveloping algebra $U(\mathfrak{g})$ by the left ideal generated by $E_{\alpha}$ for all positive roots $\alpha$ as well as $H - \chi(H) 1$ for all $H \in \mathfrak{h}$.

== W ==
weight
1. The term "weight" is another name for a character.
2. The weight subspace of a representation V of a weight $\chi: G \to \mathbb{G}_m$ is the subspace $V_{\chi} = \{ v \in V | g \cdot v = \chi(g) v \}$ that has positive dimension.
3. Similarly, for a linear functional $\chi: \mathfrak{h} \to \mathbb{C}$ of a complex Lie algebra $\mathfrak{h}$, $\chi$ is a weight of an $\mathfrak{h}$-module V if $V_{\chi} = \{ v \in V | H \cdot v = \chi(H)v \}$ has positive dimension; cf. #highest weight.
4. weight lattice
5. dominant weight: a weight \lambda is dominant if $<\lambda, \alpha> \in \mathbb{Z}^+$ for some $\alpha \in \Phi$
6. fundamental dominant weight: : Given a set of simple roots $\Delta = \{ \alpha_1 , \alpha_2 , ... , \alpha_n \}$, it is a basis of $E$. $\alpha_1^v , \alpha_2^v , ... , \alpha_n^v \in \Phi^v$ is a basis of $E$ too; the dual basis $\lambda_1 , \lambda_2 , ..., \lambda_n$ defined by $(\lambda_i, \alpha_j^v) = \delta_{ij}$ , is called the fundamental dominant weights.
7. highest weight
Weyl
1. Hermann Weyl
2. The Weyl character formula expresses the character of an irreducible representations of a complex semisimple Lie algebra in terms of highest weights.
3. The Weyl integration formula says: given a compact connected Lie group G with a maximal torus T, there exists a real continuous function u on T such that for every continuous function f on G,

$$\int_G f(g) dg = \int_T f(t) u(t) dt.$$

(Explicitly, $u$ is 1 over the cardinality of the Weyl group times the product of $|e^{\alpha(t)} - e^{-\alpha(t)}|^2$ over the roots $\alpha$.)
4. Weyl module.
5. A Weyl filtration is a filtration of a representation of a reductive group such that the quotients are isomorphic to Weyl modules.

== Y ==
Young
1. Alfred Young
2. The Young symmetrizer is the G-linear endomorphism $c_{\lambda}: V^{\otimes n} \to V^{\otimes n}$ of a tensor power of a G-module V defined according to a given partition $\lambda$. By definition, the Schur functor of a representation V assigns to V the image of $c_{\lambda}$.

== Z ==
zero
A zero representation is a zero-dimensional representation. Note: while a zero representation is a trivial representation, a trivial representation need not be zero (since “trivial” mean G acts trivially.)
