= List of representation theory topics =

This is a list of representation theory topics, by Wikipedia page. See also list of harmonic analysis topics, which is more directed towards the mathematical analysis aspects of representation theory.

See also: Glossary of representation theory

== General representation theory ==
- Linear representation
  - Unitary representation
- Trivial representation
- Irreducible representation
  - Semisimple
- Complex representation
- Real representation
- Quaternionic representation
- Pseudo-real representation
- Symplectic representation
- Schur's lemma
- Restricted representation

== Representation theory of groups ==
- Group representation
  - Group ring
- Maschke's theorem
- Regular representation
- Character (mathematics)
- Character theory
- Class function
- Representation theory of finite groups
  - Modular representation theory
- Frobenius reciprocity
  - Restricted representation
  - Induced representation
- Peter–Weyl theorem
- Young tableau
- Spherical harmonic
- Hecke operator
- Representation theory of the symmetric group
- Representation theory of diffeomorphism groups
- Permutation representation
- Affine representation
- Projective representation
  - Central extension

== Representation theory of Lie groups and Lie algebras ==
- Representation of a Lie group
- Lie algebra representation, Representation of a Lie superalgebra
- Universal enveloping algebra
  - Casimir element
  - Infinitesimal character
  - Harish-Chandra homomorphism
- Fundamental representation
- Antifundamental representation
- Bifundamental representation
- Adjoint representation
- Weight (representation theory)
- Cartan's theorem
- Spinor
- Wigner's classification, Representation theory of the Poincaré group
- Wigner–Eckart theorem
- Stone–von Neumann theorem
- Orbit method
  - Kirillov character formula
- Weyl character formula
- Discrete series representation
- Principal series representation
- Borel–Weil–Bott theorem

== Representation theory of algebras ==
- Algebra representation
- Representation theory of Hopf algebras
- Quiver (mathematics)
