= Structure constants =

Coefficients of an algebra over a field

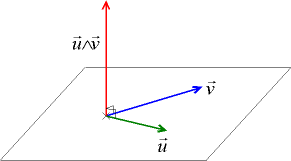
Using the cross product as a Lie bracket, the algebra of 3-dimensional real vectors is a Lie algebra isomorphic to the Lie algebras of SU(2) and SO(3). The structure constants are $f^{abc} = \epsilon^{abc}$, where $\epsilon^{abc}$ is the antisymmetric Levi-Civita symbol.

In mathematics, the structure constants or structure coefficients of an algebra over a field are the coefficients of the basis expansion (into linear combination of basis vectors) of the products of basis vectors. Because the product operation in the algebra is bilinear, by linearity knowing the product of basis vectors allows to compute the product of any elements (just like a matrix allows to compute the action of the linear operator on any vector by providing the action of the operator on basis vectors). Therefore, the structure constants can be used to specify the product operation of the algebra (just like a matrix defines a linear operator). Given the structure constants, the resulting product is obtained by bilinearity and can be uniquely extended to all vectors in the vector space, thus uniquely determining the product for the algebra.

Structure constants are used whenever an explicit form for the algebra must be given. Thus, they are frequently used when discussing Lie algebras in physics, as the basis vectors indicate specific directions in physical space, or correspond to specific particles (recall that Lie algebras are algebras over a field, with the bilinear product being given by the Lie bracket, usually defined via the commutator).

== Definition ==
Given a set of basis vectors $\{\mathbf{e}_i\}$ for the underlying vector space of the algebra, the product operation is uniquely defined by the products of basis vectors:

$$\mathbf{e}_i \cdot \mathbf{e}_j = \mathbf{c}_{ij} .$$

The structure constants or structure coefficients $c_{ij}{}^{k}$ are just the coefficients of $\mathbf{c}_{ij}$ in the same basis:

$$\mathbf{e}_i \cdot \mathbf{e}_j = \mathbf{c}_{ij} = \sum_{k} c_{ij}{}^{k} \mathbf{e}_k .$$

Otherwise said they are the coefficients that express $\mathbf{c}_{ij}$ as linear combination of the basis vectors $\mathbf{e}_{k}$.

The upper and lower indices are frequently not distinguished, unless the algebra is endowed with some other structure that would require this (for example, a pseudo-Riemannian metric, on the algebra of the indefinite orthogonal group 𝔰𝔬(p, q)). That is, structure constants are often written with all-upper, or all-lower indexes. The distinction between upper and lower is then a convention, reminding the reader that lower indices behave like the components of a dual vector, i.e. are covariant under a change of basis, while upper indices are contravariant.

The structure constants obviously depend on the chosen basis. For Lie algebras, one frequently used convention for the basis is in terms of the ladder operators defined by the Cartan subalgebra; this is presented further down in the article, after some preliminary examples.

== Example: Lie algebras ==
For a Lie algebra, the basis vectors are termed the generators of the algebra, and the product rather called the Lie bracket (often the Lie bracket is an additional product operation beyond the already existing product, thus necessitating a separate name). For two vectors $A$ and $B$ in the algebra, the Lie bracket is denoted $[A,B]$.

Again, there is no particular need to distinguish the upper and lower indices; they can be written all up or all down. In physics, it is common to use the notation $T_i$ for the generators, and $f_{ab}{}^{c}$ or $f^{abc}$ (ignoring the upper-lower distinction) for the structure constants. The linear expansion of the Lie bracket of pairs of generators then looks like

$$[T_a, T_b] = \sum_{c} f_{ab}{}^{c} T_c .$$

Again, by linear extension, the structure constants completely determine the Lie brackets of all elements of the Lie algebra.

All Lie algebras satisfy the Jacobi identity. For the basis vectors, it can be written as

$$[T_a, [T_b,T_c]] + [T_b, [T_c, T_a]] + [T_c, [T_a, T_b]] = 0$$

and this leads directly to a corresponding identity in terms of the structure constants:

$$f_{ad}{}^{e}f_{bc}{}^{d} + f_{bd}{}^{e}f_{ca}{}^{d} + f_{cd}{}^{e}f_{ab}{}^{d} = 0 .$$

The above, and the remainder of this article, make use of the Einstein summation convention for repeated indexes.

The structure constants play a role in Lie algebra representations, and in fact, give exactly the matrix elements of the adjoint representation. The Killing form and the Casimir invariant also have a particularly simple form, when written in terms of the structure constants.

The structure constants often make an appearance in the approximation to the Baker–Campbell–Hausdorff formula for the product of two elements of a Lie group. For small elements $X, Y$ of the Lie algebra, the structure of the Lie group near the identity element is given by

$$\exp(X)\exp(Y) \approx \exp(X + Y + \tfrac{1}{2}[X,Y]) .$$

Note the factor of 1/2. They also appear in explicit expressions for differentials, such as $e^{-X}de^X$; see Baker–Campbell–Hausdorff formula § Infinitesimal case for details.

== Lie algebra examples ==
=== 𝔰𝔲(2) and 𝔰𝔬(3) ===
The algebra $\mathfrak{su}(2)$ of the special unitary group SU(2) is three-dimensional, with generators given by the Pauli matrices $\sigma_i$. The generators of the group SU(2) satisfy the commutation relations (where $\varepsilon^{abc}$ is the Levi-Civita symbol):
$$[\sigma_a, \sigma_b] = 2 i \varepsilon^{abc} \sigma_c$$
where
$$\sigma_1 = \begin{pmatrix} 0 & 1 \\ 1 & 0 \end{pmatrix},~~
\sigma_2 = \begin{pmatrix} 0 & -i \\ i & 0 \end{pmatrix},~~
\sigma_3 = \begin{pmatrix} 1 & 0 \\ 0 & -1 \end{pmatrix}$$

In this case, the structure constants are $f^{abc} = 2 i \varepsilon^{abc}$. Note that the constant 2i can be absorbed into the definition of the basis vectors; thus, defining $t_a = -i\sigma_a/2$, one can equally well write
$$[t_a, t_b] = \varepsilon^{abc} t_c .$$

Doing so emphasizes that the Lie algebra $\mathfrak{su}(2)$ of the Lie group SU(2) is isomorphic to the Lie algebra $\mathfrak{so}(3)$ of SO(3). This brings the structure constants into line with those of the rotation group SO(3). That is, the commutator for the angular momentum operators are then commonly written as
$$[L_i, L_j] = \varepsilon^{ijk} L_k$$
where
$$L_x = L_1 = \begin{pmatrix} 0 & 0 & 0 \\ 0 & 0 & -1 \\ 0 & 1 & 0 \end{pmatrix},~~
L_y = L_2 = \begin{pmatrix} 0 & 0 & 1 \\ 0 & 0 & 0 \\ -1 & 0 & 0 \end{pmatrix},~~
L_z = L_3 = \begin{pmatrix} 0 & -1 & 0 \\ 1 & 0 & 0 \\ 0 & 0 & 0 \end{pmatrix}$$
are written so as to obey the right hand rule for rotations in 3-dimensional space.

The difference of the factor of 2i between these two sets of structure constants can be infuriating, as it involves some subtlety. Thus, for example, the two-dimensional complex vector space can be given a real structure. This leads to two inequivalent two-dimensional fundamental representations of $\mathfrak{su}(2)$, which are isomorphic, but are complex conjugate representations; both, however, are considered to be real representations, precisely because they act on a space with a real structure. In the case of three dimensions, there is only one three-dimensional representation, the adjoint representation, which is a real representation; more precisely, it is the same as its dual representation, shown above. That is, one has that the transpose is minus itself: $L_k^\text{T} = -L_k$.

In any case, the Lie groups are considered to be real, precisely because it is possible to write the structure constants so that they are purely real.

=== 𝔰𝔲(3) ===
A less trivial example is given by SU(3):

Its generators, T, in the defining representation, are:

$$T^a = \frac{\lambda^a }{2} ,$$

where $\lambda$, the Gell-Mann matrices, are the SU(3) analog of the Pauli matrices for SU(2):

$$\lambda^1 = \begin{pmatrix} 0 & 1 & 0 \\ 1 & 0 & 0 \\ 0 & 0 & 0 \end{pmatrix}$$	$$\lambda^2 = \begin{pmatrix} 0 & -i & 0 \\ i & 0 & 0 \\ 0 & 0 & 0 \end{pmatrix}$$	$$\lambda^3 = \begin{pmatrix} 1 & 0 & 0 \\ 0 & -1 & 0 \\ 0 & 0 & 0 \end{pmatrix}$$
$$\lambda^4 = \begin{pmatrix} 0 & 0 & 1 \\ 0 & 0 & 0 \\ 1 & 0 & 0 \end{pmatrix}$$	$$\lambda^5 = \begin{pmatrix} 0 & 0 & -i \\ 0 & 0 & 0 \\ i & 0 & 0 \end{pmatrix}$$	$$\lambda^6 = \begin{pmatrix} 0 & 0 & 0 \\ 0 & 0 & 1 \\ 0 & 1 & 0 \end{pmatrix}$$
$$\lambda^7 = \begin{pmatrix} 0 & 0 & 0 \\ 0 & 0 & -i \\ 0 & i & 0 \end{pmatrix}$$	$$\lambda^8 = \frac{1}{\sqrt{3}} \begin{pmatrix} 1 & 0 & 0 \\ 0 & 1 & 0 \\ 0 & 0 & -2 \end{pmatrix}.$$

These obey the relations

$$\left[T^a, T^b \right] = i f^{abc} T^c$$
$$\{T^a, T^b\} = \frac{1}{3}\delta^{ab} + d^{abc} T^c .$$

The structure constants are totally antisymmetric. They are given by:

$$f^{123} = 1 \,$$
$$f^{147} = -f^{156} = f^{246} = f^{257} = f^{345} = -f^{367} = \frac{1}{2}$$
$$f^{458} = f^{678} = \frac{\sqrt{3}}{2} ,$$

and all other $f^{abc}$ not related to these by permuting indices are zero.

The d take the values:

$$d^{118} = d^{228} = d^{338} = -d^{888} = \frac{1}{\sqrt{3}}$$
$$d^{448} = d^{558} = d^{668} = d^{778} = -\frac{1}{2\sqrt{3}}$$
$$d^{146} = d^{157} = -d^{247} = d^{256} = d^{344} = d^{355} = -d^{366} = -d^{377} = \frac{1}{2} .$$

=== 𝔰𝔲(N) ===
For the general case of 𝔰𝔲(N), there exists closed formula to obtain the structure constant, without having to compute commutation and anti-commutation relations between the generators. We first define the $N^{2}-1$ generators of 𝔰𝔲(N), based on a generalisation of the Pauli matrices and of the Gell-Mann matrices (using the bra-ket notation where $|m\rangle\langle n|$ is the matrix unit). There are $N(N-1)/2$ symmetric matrices,

$$\hat{T}_{\alpha_{nm}}=\frac{1}{2}(|m\rangle\langle n|+|n\rangle\langle m|) ,$$

$N(N-1)/2$ anti-symmetric matrices,

$$\hat{T}_{\beta_{nm}}=-i\frac{1}{2}(|m\rangle\langle n|-|n\rangle\langle m|) ,$$

and $N-1$ diagonal matrices,

$$\hat{T}_{\gamma_{n}}=\frac{1}{\sqrt{2n(n-1)}}\Big(\sum_{l=1}^{n-1}|l\rangle\langle l|+(1-n)|n\rangle\langle n|)\Big) .$$

To differenciate those matrices we define the following indices:

$$\alpha_{nm}=n^2+2(m-n)-1 ,$$
$$\beta_{nm}=n^2+2(m-n) ,$$
$$\gamma_{n}=n^2-1 ,$$

with the condition $1\leq m<n\leq N$.

All the non-zero totally anti-symmetric structure constants are

$$f^{\alpha_{nm}\alpha_{kn}\beta_{km}}=f^{\alpha_{nm}\alpha_{nk}\beta_{km}}=f^{\alpha_{nm}\alpha_{km}\beta_{kn}}=\frac{1}{2} ,$$
$$f^{\beta_{nm}\beta_{km}\beta_{kn}}=\frac{1}{2} ,$$
$$f^{\alpha_{nm}\beta_{nm}\gamma_{m}}=-\sqrt{\frac{m-1}{2m}},~f^{\alpha_{nm}\beta_{nm}\gamma_{n}}=\sqrt{\frac{n}{2(n-1)}} ,$$
$$f^{\alpha_{nm}\beta_{nm}\gamma_{k}}=\sqrt{\frac{1}{2k(k-1)}},~m<k<n .$$

All the non-zero totally symmetric structure constants are

$$d^{\alpha_{nm}\alpha_{kn}\alpha_{km}}=d^{\alpha_{nm}\beta_{kn}\beta_{km}}=d^{\alpha_{nm}\beta_{mk}\beta_{nk}}=\frac{1}{2} ,$$
$$d^{\alpha_{nm}\beta_{nk}\beta_{km}}=-\frac{1}{2} ,$$
$$d^{\alpha_{nm}\alpha_{nm}\gamma_{m}}=d^{\beta_{nm}\beta_{nm}\gamma_{m}}=-\sqrt{\frac{m-1}{2m}} ,$$
$$d^{\alpha_{nm}\alpha_{nm}\gamma_{k}}=d^{\beta_{nm}\beta_{nm}\gamma_{k}}=\sqrt{\frac{1}{2k(k-1)}},~m<k<n ,$$
$$d^{\alpha_{nm}\alpha_{nm}\gamma_{n}}=d^{\beta_{nm}\beta_{nm}\gamma_{n}}=\frac{2-n}{\sqrt{2n(n-1)}} ,$$
$$d^{\alpha_{nm}\alpha_{nm}\gamma_{k}}=d^{\beta_{nm}\beta_{nm}\gamma_{k}}=\sqrt{\frac{2}{k(k-1)}},~n<k ,$$
$$d^{\gamma_{n}\gamma_{k}\gamma_{k}}=\sqrt{\frac{2}{n(n-1)}},~k<n ,$$
$$d^{\gamma_{n}\gamma_{n}\gamma_{n}}=(2-n)\sqrt{\frac{2}{n(n-1)} .}$$

For more details on the derivation see and.

== Examples from other algebras ==
=== Hall polynomials ===
The Hall polynomials are the structure constants of the Hall algebra.

=== Hopf algebras ===
In addition to the product, the coproduct and the antipode of a Hopf algebra can be expressed in terms of structure constants. The connecting axiom, which defines a consistency condition on the Hopf algebra, can be expressed as a relation between these various structure constants.

== Applications ==
- A Lie group is abelian exactly when all structure constants are 0.
- A Lie group is real exactly when its structure constants are real.
- The structure constants are completely anti-symmetric in all indices if and only if the Lie algebra is a direct sum of simple compact Lie algebras.
- A nilpotent Lie group admits a lattice if and only if its Lie algebra admits a basis with rational structure constants: this is Malcev's criterion. Not all nilpotent Lie groups admit lattices; for more details, see also Raghunathan.
- In quantum chromodynamics, the symbol $G^a_{\mu \nu} \,$ represents the gauge covariant gluon field strength tensor, analogous to the electromagnetic field strength tensor, F^{μν}, in quantum electrodynamics. It is given by:
  $$G^a_{\mu \nu} = \partial_\mu \mathcal{A}^a_\nu - \partial_\nu \mathcal{A}^a_\mu + g f^{abc} \mathcal{A}^b_\mu \mathcal{A}^c_\nu \,,$$
  where f_{abc} are the structure constants of SU(3). Note that the rules to push-up or pull-down the a, b, or c indexes are trivial, (+,... +), so that f^{abc} = f_{abc} = f^{a}_{bc} whereas for the μ or ν indexes one has the non-trivial relativistic rules, corresponding e.g. to the metric signature (+ − − −).

== Choosing a basis for a Lie algebra ==
One conventional approach to providing a basis for a Lie algebra is by means of the so-called "ladder operators" appearing as eigenvectors of the Cartan subalgebra. The construction of this basis, using conventional notation, is quickly sketched here. An alternative construction (the Serre construction) can be found in the article semisimple Lie algebra.

Given a Lie algebra $\mathfrak{g}$, the Cartan subalgebra $\mathfrak{h}\subset\mathfrak{g}$ is the maximal Abelian subalgebra. By definition, it consists of those elements that commute with one-another. An orthonormal basis can be freely chosen on $\mathfrak{h}$; write this basis as $H_1,\cdots, H_r$ with

$$\langle H_i,H_j\rangle=\delta_{ij}$$

where $\langle \cdot,\cdot\rangle$ is the inner product on the vector space. The dimension $r$ of this subalgebra is called the rank of the algebra. In the adjoint representation, the matrices $\mathrm{ad}(H_i)$ are mutually commuting, and can be simultaneously diagonalized. The matrices $\mathrm{ad}(H_i)$ have (simultaneous) eigenvectors; those with a non-zero eigenvalue $\alpha$ are conventionally denoted by $E_\alpha$. Together with the $H_i$ these span the entire vector space $\mathfrak{g}$. The commutation relations are then

$$[H_i,H_j]=0 \quad \mbox{and} \quad [H_i, E_\alpha]=\alpha_i E_\alpha .$$

The eigenvectors $E_\alpha$ are determined only up to overall scale; one conventional normalization is to set

$$\langle E_\alpha,E_{-\alpha}\rangle=1 .$$

This allows the remaining commutation relations to be written as

$$[E_\alpha,E_{-\alpha}]=\alpha_i H_i$$

and

$$[E_\alpha,E_\beta]=N_{\alpha,\beta}E_{\alpha+\beta}$$

with this last subject to the condition that the roots (defined below) $\alpha,\beta$ sum to a non-zero value: $\alpha+\beta\ne 0$. The $E_\alpha$ are sometimes called ladder operators, as they have this property of raising/lowering the value of $\beta$.

For a given $\alpha$, there are as many $\alpha_i$ as there are $H_i$ and so one may define the vector $\alpha=\alpha_iH_i$, this vector is termed a root of the algebra. The roots of Lie algebras appear in regular structures (for example, in simple Lie algebras, the roots can have only two different lengths); see root system for details.

The structure constants $N_{\alpha,\beta}$ have the property that they are non-zero only when $\alpha+\beta$ are a root. In addition, they are antisymmetric:

$$N_{\alpha,\beta}=-N_{\beta,\alpha}$$

and can always be chosen such that

$$N_{\alpha,\beta}=-N_{-\alpha,-\beta}$$

They also obey cocycle conditions:

$$N_{\alpha,\beta}=N_{\beta,\gamma}=N_{\gamma,\alpha}$$

whenever $\alpha+\beta+\gamma=0$, and also that

$$N_{\alpha,\beta}N_{\gamma,\delta} +
N_{\beta,\gamma}N_{\alpha,\delta} +
N_{\gamma,\alpha}N_{\beta,\delta} = 0$$

whenever $\alpha+\beta+\gamma+\delta=0$.
