= Tensor product of representations =

Concept in mathematics

In mathematics, the tensor product of representations is a tensor product of vector spaces underlying representations together with the factor-wise group action on the product. This construction, together with the Clebsch–Gordan procedure, can be used to generate additional irreducible representations if one already knows a few.

== Definition ==
=== Group representations ===
If $V_1, V_2$ are linear representations of a group $G$, then their tensor product is the tensor product of vector spaces $V_1 \otimes V_2$ with the linear action of $G$ uniquely determined by the condition that

$g \cdot (v_1 \otimes v_2) = (g\cdot v_1) \otimes (g\cdot v_2)$

for all $v_1\in V_1$ and $v_2\in V_2$. Although not every element of $V_1 \otimes V_2$ is expressible in the form $v_1\otimes v_2$, the universal property of the tensor product guarantees that this action is well-defined.

In the language of homomorphisms, if the actions of $G$ on $V_1$ and $V_2$ are given by homomorphisms $\Pi_1: G\to\operatorname{GL}(V_1)$ and $\Pi_2: G\to\operatorname{GL}(V_2)$, then the tensor product representation is given by the homomorphism $\Pi_1\otimes\Pi_2: G\to\operatorname{GL}(V_1 \otimes V_2)$ given by

$$\Pi_1\otimes\Pi_2(g) = \Pi_1(g)\otimes\Pi_2(g)$$,

where $\Pi_1(g)\otimes\Pi_2(g)$ is the tensor product of linear maps.

One can extend the notion of tensor products to any finite number of representations. If V is a linear representation of a group G, then with the above linear action, the tensor algebra $T(V)$ is an algebraic representation of G; i.e., each element of G acts as an algebra automorphism.

=== Lie algebra representations ===
If $(V_1,\pi_1)$ and $(V_2,\pi_2)$ are representations of a Lie algebra $\mathfrak g$, then the tensor product of these representations is the map $\pi_1\otimes\pi_2:\mathfrak g\to\operatorname{End}(V_1 \otimes V_2)$ given by

$$\pi_1\otimes\pi_2(X)=\pi_1(X)\otimes I+I\otimes\pi_2(X)$$,

where $I$ is the identity endomorphism. This is called the Kronecker sum. The motivation for the use of the Kronecker sum in this definition comes from the case in which $\pi_1$ and $\pi_2$ come from representations $\Pi_1$ and $\Pi_2$ of a Lie group $G$. In that case, a simple computation shows that the Lie algebra representation associated to $\Pi_1\otimes\Pi_2$ is given by the preceding formula.

=== Quantum groups ===
For quantum groups, the coproduct is no longer co-commutative. As a result, the natural permutation map $V \otimes W \rightarrow W \otimes V$ is no longer an isomorphism of modules. However, the permutation map remains an isomorphism of vector spaces.

== Action on linear maps ==
If $(V_1, \Pi_1)$ and $(V_2, \Pi_2)$ are representations of a group $G$, let $\operatorname{Hom}(V_1,V_2)$ denote the space of all linear maps from $V_1$ to $V_2$. Then $\operatorname{Hom}(V_1,V_2)$ can be given the structure of a representation by defining

$$g\cdot A=\Pi_2(g)A\Pi_1(g)^{-1}$$

for all $A\in\operatorname{Hom}(V,W)$. Now, there is a natural isomorphism

$$\operatorname{Hom}(V, W)\cong V^* \otimes W$$

as vector spaces; this vector space isomorphism is in fact an isomorphism of representations.

The trivial subrepresentation $\operatorname{Hom}(V, W)^G$ consists of G-linear maps; i.e.,

$$\operatorname{Hom}_G(V, W) = \operatorname{Hom}(V, W)^G.$$

Let $E = \operatorname{End}(V)$ denote the endomorphism algebra of V and let A denote the subalgebra of $E^{\otimes m}$ consisting of symmetric tensors. The main theorem of invariant theory states that A is semisimple when the characteristic of the base field is zero.

== Clebsch–Gordan theory ==
=== The general problem ===
The tensor product of two irreducible representations $V_1,V_2$ of a group or Lie algebra is usually not irreducible. It is therefore of interest to attempt to decompose $V_1\otimes V_2$ into irreducible pieces. This decomposition problem is known as the Clebsch–Gordan problem.

=== The SU(2) case ===
The prototypical example of this problem is the case of the rotation group SO(3)—or its double cover, the special unitary group SU(2). The irreducible representations of SU(2) are described by a parameter $\ell$, whose possible values are

$$\ell=0, 1/2, 1, 3/2, \ldots.$$

(The dimension of the representation is then $2\ell+1$.) Let us take two parameters $\ell$ and $m$ with $\ell\geq m$. Then the tensor product representation $V_\ell\otimes V_m$ decomposes as follows:

$$V_\ell\otimes V_m\cong V_{\ell+m}\oplus V_{\ell+m-1}\oplus\cdots\oplus V_{\ell-m+1}\oplus V_{\ell-m}.$$

Consider, as an example, the tensor product of the four-dimensional representation $V_{3/2}$ and the three-dimensional representation $V_1$. The tensor product representation $V_{3/2}\otimes V_1$ has dimension 12 and decomposes as

$$V_{3/2}\otimes V_1\cong V_{5/2}\oplus V_{3/2}\oplus V_{1/2}$$,

where the representations on the right-hand side have dimension 6, 4, and 2, respectively. We may summarize this result arithmetically as $4 \times 3 = 6+4+2$.

=== The SU(3) case ===
In the case of the group SU(3), all the irreducible representations can be generated from the standard 3-dimensional representation and its dual, as follows. To generate the representation with label $(m_1,m_2)$, one takes the tensor product of $m_1$ copies of the standard representation and $m_2$ copies of the dual of the standard representation, and then takes the invariant subspace generated by the tensor product of the highest weight vectors.

In contrast to the situation for SU(2), in the Clebsch–Gordan decomposition for SU(3), a given irreducible representation $W$ may occur more than once in the decomposition of $U\otimes V$.

== Tensor power ==
As with vector spaces, one can define the k^{th} tensor power of a representation V to be the vector space $V^{\otimes k}$ with the action given above.

=== The symmetric and alternating square ===
Over a field of characteristic zero, the symmetric and alternating squares are subrepresentations of the second tensor power. They can be used to define the Frobenius–Schur indicator, which indicates whether a given irreducible character is real, complex, or quaternionic. They are examples of Schur functors. They are defined as follows.

Let V be a vector space. Define an endomorphism T of $V \otimes V$ as follows:

$$\begin{align}
T: V \otimes V &\longrightarrow V \otimes V \\
v \otimes w &\longmapsto w \otimes v.
\end{align}$$

It is an involution (its own inverse), and so is an automorphism of $V \otimes V$.

Define two subsets of the second tensor power of V,

$$\begin{align}
\operatorname{Sym}^2(V) &:= \{v \in V \otimes V \mid T(v)=v \} \\
\operatorname{Alt}^2(V) &:= \{v \in V \otimes V \mid T(v)=-v \}
\end{align}$$

These are the symmetric square of V, $V \odot V$, and the alternating square of V, $V\wedge V$, respectively. The symmetric and alternating squares are also known as the symmetric part and antisymmetric part of the tensor product.

==== Properties ====
The second tensor power of a linear representation V of a group G decomposes as the direct sum of the symmetric and alternating squares:

$$V^{\otimes 2} = V \otimes V \cong \operatorname{Sym}^2(V) \oplus \operatorname{Alt}^2(V)$$

as representations. In particular, both are subrepresentations of the second tensor power. In the language of modules over the group ring, the symmetric and alternating squares are $\mathbb{C}[G]$-submodules of $V \otimes V$.

If V has a basis $\{v_1,v_2,\ldots,v_n\}$, then the symmetric square has a basis $\{v_i\otimes v_j+v_j\otimes v_i\mid 1\leq i\leq j\leq n\}$ and the alternating square has a basis $\{v_i\otimes v_j-v_j\otimes v_i\mid 1\leq i<j\leq n\}$. Accordingly,

$$\begin{align}
\dim\operatorname{Sym}^2(V) &= \frac{\dim V(\dim V + 1)}{2}, \\
\dim\operatorname{Alt}^2(V) &= \frac{\dim V(\dim V - 1)}{2}.
\end{align}$$

Let $\chi:G\to\mathbb{C}$ be the character of $V$. Then we can calculate the characters of the symmetric and alternating squares as follows: for all g in G,

$$\begin{align}
\chi_{\operatorname{Sym}^2(V)}(g) &= \frac{1}{2}(\chi(g)^2+\chi(g^2)), \\
\chi_{\operatorname{Alt}^2(V)}(g) &= \frac{1}{2}(\chi(g)^2-\chi(g^2)).
\end{align}$$

=== The symmetric and exterior powers ===
As in multilinear algebra, over a field of characteristic zero, one can more generally define the k^{th} symmetric power $\operatorname{Sym}^k(V)$ and k^{th} exterior power $\Lambda^k(V)$, which are subspaces of the k^{th} tensor power (see those pages for more detail on this construction). They are also subrepresentations, but higher tensor powers no longer decompose as their direct sum.

The Schur–Weyl duality computes the irreducible representations occurring in tensor powers of representations of the general linear group $G = \operatorname{GL}(V)$. Precisely, as an $S_n \times G$-module

$$V^{\otimes n} \simeq \bigoplus_\lambda M_{\lambda} \otimes S^{\lambda}(V)$$

where

- $M_{\lambda}$ is an irreducible representation of the symmetric group $S_n$ corresponding to a partition $\lambda$ of n (in decreasing order),
- $S^{\lambda}(V)$ is the image of the Young symmetrizer $c_{\lambda}: V^{\otimes n} \to V^{\otimes n}$.

The mapping $V \mapsto S^{\lambda}(V)$ is a functor called the Schur functor. It generalizes the constructions of symmetric and exterior powers:

$$S^{(n)}(V) = \operatorname{Sym}^n V, \,\, S^{(1, 1, \dots, 1)}(V) = \wedge^n V.$$

In particular, as a G-module, the above simplifies to

$$V^{\otimes n} \simeq \bigoplus_{\lambda} S^{\lambda}(V)^{\oplus m_{\lambda}}$$

where $m_\lambda = \dim M_\lambda$. Moreover, the multiplicity $m_{\lambda}$ may be computed by the Frobenius formula (or the hook length formula). For example, take $n = 3$. Then there are exactly three partitions: $3 = 3 = 2 + 1 = 1 + 1 + 1$ and, as it turns out, $m_{(3)} = m_{(1, 1, 1)} = 1, \, m_{(2, 1)} = 2$. Hence,

$$V^{\otimes 3} \simeq \operatorname{Sym}^3 V \bigoplus \wedge^3 V \bigoplus S^{(2, 1)}(V)^{\oplus 2}.$$

== Tensor products involving Schur functors ==
Let $S^{\lambda}$ denote the Schur functor defined according to a partition $\lambda$. Then there is the following decomposition:

$$S^{\lambda} V \otimes S^{\mu} V \simeq \bigoplus_{\nu} (S^{\nu} V)^{\oplus N_{\lambda \mu \nu}}$$

where the multiplicities $N_{\lambda \mu \nu}$ are given by the Littlewood–Richardson rule.

Given finite-dimensional vector spaces V, W, the Schur functors S^{λ} give the decomposition

$$\operatorname{Sym}(W^* \otimes V) \simeq \bigoplus_{\lambda} S^{\lambda}(W^*) \otimes S^{\lambda}(V)$$

The left-hand side can be identified with the ring of polynomial functions on Hom(V, W ), k[Hom(V, W )] = k[V^{*} ⊗ W ], and so the above also gives the decomposition of k[Hom(V, W )].

== Tensor products representations as representations of product groups ==
Let G, H be two groups and let $(\pi,V)$ and $(\rho,W)$ be representations of G and H, respectively. Then we can let the direct product group $G \times H$ act on the tensor product space $V \otimes W$ by the formula

$$(g, h) \cdot (v \otimes w) = \pi(g) v \otimes \rho(h) w.$$

Even if $G=H$, we can still perform this construction, so that the tensor product of two representations of $G$ could, alternatively, be viewed as a representation of $G \times G$ rather than a representation of $G$. It is therefore important to clarify whether the tensor product of two representations of $G$ is being viewed as a representation of $G$ or as a representation of $G \times G$.

In contrast to the Clebsch–Gordan problem discussed above, the tensor product of two irreducible representations of $G$ is irreducible when viewed as a representation of the product group $G \times G$.

== See also ==
- Dual representation
- Hermite reciprocity
- Clebsch–Gordan coefficients
- Kronecker product
- Hopf algebra
