= Symplectic =

The term "symplectic" is a calque of "complex" introduced by Hermann Weyl in 1939. In mathematics it may refer to:

- Symplectic category
- Symplectic Clifford algebra, see Weyl algebra
- Symplectic geometry
- Symplectic group, and corresponding symplectic Lie algebra
- Symplectic integrator
- Symplectic manifold
- Symplectic matrix
- Symplectic representation
- Symplectic vector space, a vector space with a symplectic bilinear form

It can also refer to:

- Symplectic bone, a bone found in fish skulls
- Symplectite, in reference to a mineral intergrowth texture

== See also ==
- Metaplectic group
- Symplectomorphism
