= Real character =

Real character may refer to:

- Real character, a constructed family of symbols, outlined by John Wilkins in the 1668 publication An Essay Towards a Real Character, and a Philosophical Language
- Real character, a concept in representation theory in mathematics
- as in e,.g. "He's a real character", used in informal English to describe an interesting, amusing, or unique individual
