= Symplectic form =

Symplectic form refers to a type of bilinear form or a type of 2-form. See:

- Symplectic vector space, a vector space with a symplectic bilinear form
- Symplectic manifold, a smooth manifold with a symplectic 2-form
