= Frobenius–Schur indicator =

In mathematics, and especially the discipline of representation theory, the Schur indicator, named after Issai Schur, or Frobenius–Schur indicator describes what invariant bilinear forms a given irreducible representation of a compact group on a complex vector space has. It can be used to classify the irreducible representations of compact groups on real vector spaces.

== Definition ==
If a finite-dimensional continuous representation of a compact group G has character χ its Frobenius–Schur indicator is defined to be

$$\int_{g\in G}\chi(g^2)\,d\mu$$

for Haar measure μ with μ(G) = 1. When G is finite it is given by

$${1\over |G|}\sum_{g\in G}\chi(g^2).$$

If χ is a complex irreducible representation, then its Frobenius–Schur indicator is 1, 0, or −1. It provides a criterion for deciding whether a real irreducible representation of G is real, complex or quaternionic, in a specific sense defined below. Much of the content below discusses the case of finite groups, but the general compact case is analogous.

== Real irreducible representations ==
There are three types of irreducible real representations of a finite group on a real vector space V, as Schur's lemma implies that the endomorphism ring commuting with the group action is a real associative division algebra and by the Frobenius theorem can only be isomorphic to either the real numbers, or the complex numbers, or the quaternions.

- If the ring is the real numbers, then V⊗C is an irreducible complex representation with Schur indicator 1, also called a real representation.
- If the ring is the complex numbers, then V has two different conjugate complex structures, giving two irreducible complex representations with Schur indicator 0, sometimes called complex representations.
- If the ring is the quaternions, then choosing a subring of the quaternions isomorphic to the complex numbers makes V into an irreducible complex representation of G with Schur indicator −1, called a quaternionic representation.

Moreover, every irreducible representation on a complex vector space can be constructed from a unique irreducible representation on a real vector space in one of the three ways above. So knowing the irreducible representations on complex spaces and their Schur indicators allows one to read off the irreducible representations on real spaces.

Real representations can be complexified to get a complex representation of the same dimension and complex representations can be converted into a real representation of twice the dimension by treating the real and imaginary components separately. Also, since all finite dimensional complex representations can be turned into a unitary representation, for unitary representations the dual representation is also a (complex) conjugate representation because the Hilbert space norm gives an antilinear bijective map from the representation to its dual representation.

Self-dual complex irreducible representation correspond to either real irreducible representation of the same dimension or real irreducible representations of twice the dimension called quaternionic representations (but not both) and non-self-dual complex irreducible representation correspond to a real irreducible representation of twice the dimension. Note for the latter case, both the complex irreducible representation and its dual give rise to the same real irreducible representation. An example of a quaternionic representation would be the four-dimensional real irreducible representation of the quaternion group Q_{8}.

== Definition in terms of the symmetric and alternating square ==
If V is the underlying vector space of a representation of a group G, then the tensor product representation $V\otimes V$ can be decomposed as the direct sum of two subrepresentations, the symmetric square, denoted $\operatorname{Sym}^2(V)$ (also often denoted by $V\otimes_S V$ or $V\odot V$) and the alternating square, $\operatorname{Alt}^2(V)$(also often denoted by $\wedge^2V$, $V\otimes_A V$, or $V \wedge V$). In terms of these square representations, the indicator has the following, alternate definition:

$$\iota\chi_V=\begin{cases}
1 &\text{if }W_{\text{triv}}\text{ is a subrepresentation of }\operatorname{Sym}^2(V) \\
-1 &\text{if }W_{\text{triv}}\text{ is a subrepresentation of }\operatorname{Alt}^2(V) \\
0 &\text{otherwise}
\end{cases}$$

where $W_{\text{triv}}$ is the trivial representation.

To see this, note that the term $\chi(g^2)$ naturally arises in the characters of these representations; to wit, we have

$\chi_V(g^2)=\chi_V(g)^2-2\chi_{\wedge^2V}(g)$

and

$\chi_V(g^2)=2\chi_{\operatorname{Sym}^2(V)}(g)-\chi_V(g)^2$.

Substituting either of these formulae, the Frobenius–Schur indicator takes on the structure of the natural G-invariant inner product on class functions:

$$\iota\chi_V =
\begin{cases}
1 &\langle\chi_{\text{triv}},\chi_{\operatorname{Sym}^2(V)}\rangle=1 \\
-1 &\langle\chi_{\text{triv}},\chi_{\operatorname{Alt}^2(V)}\rangle=1 \\
0 &\text{otherwise} \\
\end{cases}$$

The inner product counts the multiplicities of direct summands; the equivalence of the definitions then follows immediately.

== Applications ==
Let V be an irreducible complex representation of a group G (or equivalently, an irreducible $\mathbb{C}[G]$-module, where $\mathbb{C}[G]$ denotes the group ring). Then

1. There exists a nonzero G-invariant bilinear form on V if and only if $\iota\chi\neq 0$
2. There exists a nonzero G-invariant symmetric bilinear form on V if and only if $\iota\chi=1$
3. There exists a nonzero G-invariant skew-symmetric bilinear form on V if and only if $\iota\chi=-1$.

The above is a consequence of the universal properties of the symmetric algebra and exterior algebra, which are the underlying vector spaces of the symmetric and alternating square.

Additionally,

1. $\iota\chi=0$ if and only if $\chi$ is not real-valued (these are complex representations),
2. $\iota\chi=1$ if and only if $\chi$ can be realized over $\mathbb{R}$ (these are real representations), and
3. $\iota\chi=-1$ if and only if $\chi$ is real but cannot be realized over $\mathbb{R}$ (these are quaternionic representations).

== Higher Frobenius-Schur indicators ==
Just as for any complex representation ρ,

$$\frac{1}{|G|}\sum_{g\in G}\rho(g)$$

is a self-intertwiner, for any integer n,

$$\frac{1}{|G|}\sum_{g\in G}\rho(g^n)$$

is also a self-intertwiner. By Schur's lemma, this will be a multiple of the identity for irreducible representations. The trace of this self-intertwiner is called the n^{th} Frobenius-Schur indicator.

The original case of the Frobenius–Schur indicator is that for n = 2. The zeroth indicator is the dimension of the irreducible representation, the first indicator would be 1 for the trivial representation and zero for the other irreducible representations.

It resembles the Casimir invariants for Lie algebra irreducible representations. In fact, since any representation of G can be thought of as a module for C[G] and vice versa, we can look at the center of C[G]. This is analogous to looking at the center of the universal enveloping algebra of a Lie algebra. It is simple to check that

$$\sum_{g\in G}g^n$$

belongs to the center of C[G], which is simply the subspace of class functions on G.
