= Chevalley theorem =

Several theorems proved by the French mathematician Claude Chevalley bear his name.

- Chevalley–Shephard–Todd theorem in invariant theory of finite groups.
- Chevalley–Warning theorem concerning solvability of polynomial equations over finite fields.
- Chevalley restriction theorem identifying the invariants of the adjoint action of a semisimple algebraic group with the invariants of its Weyl group acting on the Cartan subalgebra.
- Chevalley's structure theorem on algebraic groups: if G is an algebraic group then it contains a unique closed normal subgroup N such that N is affine and the quotient G/N is an abelian variety.
- Chevalley's theorem on constructible sets.
