= Real representation =

Type of representation in representation theory

In the mathematical field of representation theory a real representation is usually a representation on a real vector space U, but it can also mean a representation on a complex vector space V with an invariant real structure, i.e., an antilinear equivariant map

$$j\colon V\to V$$

which satisfies

$$j^2=+1.$$

The two viewpoints are equivalent because if U is a real vector space acted on by a group G (say), then V = U⊗C is a representation on a complex vector space with an antilinear equivariant map given by complex conjugation. Conversely, if V is such a complex representation, then U can be recovered as the fixed point set of j (the eigenspace with eigenvalue 1).

In physics, where representations are often viewed concretely in terms of matrices, a real representation is one in which the entries of the matrices representing the group elements are real numbers. These matrices can act either on real or complex column vectors.

A real representation on a complex vector space is isomorphic to its complex conjugate representation, but the converse is not true: a representation which is isomorphic to its complex conjugate but which is not real is called a pseudoreal representation. An irreducible pseudoreal representation V is necessarily a quaternionic representation: it admits an invariant quaternionic structure, i.e., an antilinear equivariant map

$$j\colon V\to V$$

which satisfies

$$j^2=-1.$$

A direct sum of real and quaternionic representations is neither real nor quaternionic in general.

A representation on a complex vector space can also be isomorphic to the dual representation of its complex conjugate. This happens precisely when the representation admits a nondegenerate invariant sesquilinear form, e.g. a hermitian form. Such representations are sometimes said to be complex or (pseudo-)hermitian.

== Frobenius-Schur indicator ==
A criterion (for compact groups G) for reality of irreducible representations in terms of character theory is based on the Frobenius-Schur indicator defined by

$$\int_{g\in G}\chi(g^2)\,d\mu$$

where χ is the character of the representation and μ is the Haar measure with μ(G) = 1. For a finite group, this is given by

$${1\over |G|}\sum_{g\in G}\chi(g^2).$$

The indicator may take the values 1, 0 or −1. If the indicator is 1, then the representation is real. If the indicator is zero, the representation is complex (hermitian), and if the indicator is −1, the representation is quaternionic.

== Examples ==
All representation of the symmetric groups are real (and in fact rational), since we can build a complete set of irreducible representations using Young tableaux.

All representations of the rotation groups on odd-dimensional spaces are real, since they all appear as subrepresentations of tensor products of copies of the fundamental representation, which is real.

Further examples of real representations are the spinor representations of the spin groups in 8k−1, 8k, and 8k+1 dimensions for k = 1, 2, 3 ... This periodicity modulo 8 is known in mathematics not only in the theory of Clifford algebras, but also in algebraic topology, in KO-theory; see spin representation and Bott periodicity.
