= Specht module =

Representation of symmetric groups

In mathematics, a Specht module is one of the representations of symmetric groups studied by Wilhelm Specht (1935). They are indexed by partitions, and in characteristic 0 the Specht modules of partitions of n form a complete set of irreducible representations of the symmetric group on n points.

== Definition ==
Fix a partition λ of n and a commutative ring k. The partition determines a Young diagram with n boxes. A Young tableau of shape λ is a way of labelling the boxes of this Young diagram by distinct numbers $1, \dots, n$.

A tabloid is an equivalence class of Young tableaux where two labellings are equivalent if one is obtained from the other by permuting the entries of each row. For each Young tableau T of shape λ let $\{T\}$ be the corresponding tabloid. The symmetric group on n points acts on the set of Young tableaux of shape λ. Consequently, it acts on tabloids, and on the free k-module V with the tabloids as basis.

Given a Young tableau T of shape λ, let

$$E_T=\sum_{\sigma\in Q_T}\epsilon(\sigma)\{\sigma(T)\} \in V$$

where Q_{T} is the subgroup of permutations preserving (as sets) all columns of T and $\epsilon(\sigma)$ is the sign of the permutation σ. The Specht module of the partition λ is the module generated by the elements E_{T} as T runs through all tableaux of shape λ.

The Specht module has a basis of elements E_{T} for T a standard Young tableau.

A gentle introduction to the construction of the Specht module may be found in Section 1 of "Specht Polytopes and Specht Matroids".

== Structure ==
The dimension of the Specht module $V_\lambda$ is the number of standard Young tableaux of shape $\lambda$. It is given by the hook length formula.

Over fields of characteristic 0 the Specht modules are irreducible, and form a complete set of irreducible representations of the symmetric group.

A partition is called p-regular (for a prime number p) if it does not have p parts of the same (positive) size. Over fields of characteristic p>0 the Specht modules can be reducible. For p-regular partitions they have a unique irreducible quotient, and these irreducible quotients form a complete set of irreducible representations.

== See also ==
- Garnir relations, a more detailed description of the structure of Specht modules.
- Representation theory of the symmetric group
