= Weyl module =

In algebra, a Weyl module is a representation of a reductive algebraic group, introduced by Carter and Lusztig (1974, 1974b) and named after Hermann Weyl. In characteristic 0 these representations are irreducible, but in positive characteristic they can be reducible, and their decomposition into irreducible components can be hard to determine.

== See also ==
- Borel–Weil–Bott theorem
- Garnir relations
