= Faithful representation =

Linear representation in abstract algebra

In mathematics, especially in an area of abstract algebra known as representation theory, a faithful representation ρ of a group G on a vector space V is a linear representation in which different elements g of G are represented by distinct linear mappings ρ(g). In more abstract language, this means that the group homomorphism $\rho: G\to GL(V)$ is injective (or one-to-one).

== Caveat ==
While representations of G over a field K are de facto the same as K[G]-modules (with K[G] denoting the group algebra of the group G), a faithful representation of G is not necessarily a faithful module for the group algebra. In fact each faithful K[G]-module is a faithful representation of G, but the converse does not hold. Consider for example the natural representation of the symmetric group S_{n} in n dimensions by permutation matrices, which is certainly faithful. Here the order of the group is n! while the n × n matrices form a vector space of dimension n^{2}. As soon as n is at least 4, dimension counting means that some linear dependence must occur between permutation matrices (since 24 > 16); this relation means that the module for the group algebra is not faithful.

== Properties ==
A representation V of a finite group G over an algebraically closed field K of characteristic zero is faithful (as a representation) if and only if every irreducible representation of G occurs as a subrepresentation of S^{n}V (the n-th symmetric power of the representation V) for a sufficiently high n. Also, V is faithful (as a representation) if and only if every irreducible representation of G occurs as a subrepresentation of

$$V^{\otimes n} = \underbrace{V \otimes V \otimes \cdots \otimes V}_{n\text{ times}}$$

(the n-th tensor power of the representation V) for a sufficiently high n.
