= Spin representation =

Particular projective representations of the orthogonal or special orthogonal groups

In mathematics, the spin representations are particular projective representations of the orthogonal or special orthogonal groups in arbitrary dimension and signature (i.e., including indefinite orthogonal groups). More precisely, they are two equivalent representations of the spin groups, which are double covers of the special orthogonal groups. They are usually studied over the real or complex numbers, but they can be defined over other fields.

Elements of a spin representation are called spinors. They play an important role in the physical description of fermions such as the electron.

The spin representations may be constructed in several ways, but typically the construction involves (perhaps only implicitly) the choice of a maximal isotropic subspace in the vector representation of the group. Over the real numbers, this usually requires using a complexification of the vector representation. For this reason, it is convenient to define the spin representations over the complex numbers first, and derive real representations by introducing real structures.

The properties of the spin representations depend, in a subtle way, on the dimension and signature of the orthogonal group. In particular, spin representations often admit invariant bilinear forms, which can be used to embed the spin groups into classical Lie groups. In low dimensions, these embeddings are surjective and determine special isomorphisms between the spin groups and more familiar Lie groups; this elucidates the properties of spinors in these dimensions.

== Set-up ==
Let $V$ be a finite-dimensional vector space over $\mathbb R$ or $\mathbb C$, equipped with a nondegenerate quadratic form $Q$. The orthogonal group and special orthogonal group of $(V,Q)$ are

$$\operatorname{O}(V,Q)
= \{g\in \operatorname{GL}(V):Q(gv)=Q(v)\text{ for all }v\in V\},
\qquad
\operatorname{SO}(V,Q)
= \operatorname{O}(V,Q)\cap \operatorname{SL}(V).$$

Thus $\operatorname{SO}(V,Q)$ denotes the determinant-one subgroup, rather than necessarily the identity component of $\operatorname{O}(V,Q)$. If $V$ is real and $Q$ is indefinite, then $\operatorname{SO}(V,Q)$ generally has two connected components; its identity component is denoted by $\operatorname{SO}_0(V,Q)$ or $\operatorname{SO}^{+}(V,Q)$.

Over $\mathbb C$, every nondegenerate quadratic form is determined up to isomorphism by the dimension $n$ of $V$. One may therefore take $V=\mathbb C^n$ and

$$Q(z_1,\ldots,z_n)=z_1^2+\cdots+z_n^2.$$

The corresponding groups and Lie algebra are denoted by $\operatorname{O}(n,\mathbb C)$, $\operatorname{SO}(n,\mathbb C)$, $\operatorname{Spin}(n,\mathbb C)$, and $\mathfrak{so}(n,\mathbb C)$. The group $\operatorname{SO}(n,\mathbb C)$ is connected.

Over $\mathbb R$, Sylvester's law of inertia shows that a nondegenerate quadratic form is determined up to isomorphism by its signature $(p,q)$, where $p+q=n$. One may take $V=\mathbb R^{p,q}$ and

$$Q(x_1,\ldots,x_n)
=x_1^2+\cdots+x_p^2
-(x_{p+1}^2+\cdots+x_{p+q}^2).$$

The corresponding groups and Lie algebra are denoted by $\operatorname{O}(p,q)$, $\operatorname{SO}(p,q)$, $\operatorname{Spin}(p,q)$, and $\mathfrak{so}(p,q)$.

The spin group is defined naturally through the Clifford algebra of $(V,Q)$. With the convention used here,

$$\operatorname{Cl}(V,Q)
=T(V)\big/\langle v\otimes v-Q(v)1:v\in V\rangle,$$

so that $v^2=Q(v)1$ in $\operatorname{Cl}(V,Q)$. Let $\operatorname{Cl}^0(V,Q)$ be its even subalgebra, and let $x\mapsto\widetilde{x}$ denote reversion, the anti-automorphism determined by

$$\widetilde{v_1v_2\cdots v_k}=v_k\cdots v_2v_1.$$

The spin group may then be defined by

$$\operatorname{Spin}(V,Q)
=
\{x\in\operatorname{Cl}^0(V,Q)^\times:
xVx^{-1}=V,\quad x\widetilde{x}=1\}.$$

Conjugation in the Clifford algebra gives a homomorphism

$$h:\operatorname{Spin}(V,Q)\longrightarrow\operatorname{SO}(V,Q),
\qquad
h(x)(v)=xvx^{-1}.$$

In the complex case this gives an exact sequence

$$1\longrightarrow\{1,-1\}
\longrightarrow\operatorname{Spin}(n,\mathbb C)
\mathrel{\mathop{\longrightarrow}^{h}}
\operatorname{SO}(n,\mathbb C)
\longrightarrow 1.$$

In real signature $(p,q)$, the corresponding exact sequence is

$$1\longrightarrow\{1,-1\}
\longrightarrow\operatorname{Spin}(p,q)
\mathrel{\mathop{\longrightarrow}^{h}}
\operatorname{SO}_0(p,q)
\longrightarrow 1.$$

Thus $h(x)=h(-x)$. The element $-1$ here is the scalar element of the Clifford algebra and should not be confused with the orthogonal transformation $-I$. Although $h$ is a twofold covering homomorphism, $\operatorname{Spin}(p,q)$ is not in general the universal covering group of $\operatorname{SO}_0(p,q)$ in indefinite signature. The analogous construction for the full orthogonal group uses a pin group.

The differential of $h$ identifies the Lie algebra of the spin group with the orthogonal Lie algebra:

$$\mathfrak{spin}(V,Q)\cong\mathfrak{so}(V,Q).$$

If $V$ is real, its complexification $V_{\mathbb C}=V\otimes_{\mathbb R}\mathbb C$ carries the complexified quadratic form $Q_{\mathbb C}$, and

$$\operatorname{Cl}(V,Q)\otimes_{\mathbb R}\mathbb C
\cong \operatorname{Cl}(V_{\mathbb C},Q_{\mathbb C}),
\qquad
\mathfrak{so}(p,q)\otimes_{\mathbb R}\mathbb C
\cong \mathfrak{so}(n,\mathbb C).$$

The inclusion of the real Clifford algebra into its complexification realizes $\operatorname{Spin}(p,q)$ as a real subgroup of $\operatorname{Spin}(n,\mathbb C)$.

A complex spinor module is an irreducible module for the complex Clifford algebra. Restricting its Clifford action to the spin group gives the complex spin representation. Its form depends on the parity of $n$:

- If $n=2m+1$ is odd, the complex Clifford algebra has two inequivalent irreducible modules of dimension $2^m$. Their restrictions to $\operatorname{Spin}(n,\mathbb C)$ are equivalent and give a single irreducible spin representation, denoted by $S$.
- If $n=2m$ is even, the complex Clifford algebra has one irreducible module $S$ of dimension $2^m$. Its restriction to $\operatorname{Spin}(n,\mathbb C)$ decomposes as

$$S=S_+\oplus S_-,$$

where $S_+$ and $S_-$ are inequivalent irreducible representations of dimension $2^{m-1}$. They are called the positive and negative half-spin, chiral, or Weyl representations; $S$ is called the Dirac spin representation.

The central element $-1$ acts on every spinor module as $-\operatorname{id}_S$. Consequently, a spin representation does not descend to a linear representation of the corresponding special orthogonal group, but its projectivization does descend to a projective representation. The condition $-1\notin\ker\rho$, however, does not characterize the spin representations: it merely says that an arbitrary representation $\rho$ of the spin group does not factor through the special orthogonal group.

For a real quadratic space of signature $(p,q)$, the complex spin representations are obtained by restricting the complex spin modules to $\operatorname{Spin}(p,q)$. The existence of invariant real, quaternionic, or Hermitian structures on these modules depends on $p-q$ modulo $8$. It is therefore convenient first to construct the complex spin representations and then to analyze their restrictions and possible real structures.

== Complex spin representations ==
Let V = C^{n} with the standard quadratic form Q so that

$$\mathfrak{so}(V,Q) = \mathfrak{so}(n,\mathbb C).$$

The symmetric bilinear form on V associated to Q by polarization is denoted ⟨.,.⟩.

=== Isotropic subspaces and root systems ===
Suppose that $Q(x)=1, Q(y)=1, <x,y>=0$ for $x,y\in V$. Then $Q(x+iy)=Q(x)-Q(y)=0$. We say that $x+iy$ is isotropic and that it generates a one-dimensional totally isotropic subspace $\{ \lambda (x+iy) | \lambda \in C \}$. Similarly, $x-iy$ is isotropic and generates a one-dimensional totally isotropic subspace.

A standard construction of the spin representations of so(n, C) begins with a choice of a pair (W, W^{∗}) of maximal totally isotropic subspaces (with respect to Q) of V with W ∩ W^{∗} = 0. Let us make such a choice. If n = 2m or n = 2m + 1, then W and W^{∗} both have dimension m. If n = 2m, then V = W ⊕ W^{∗}, whereas if n = 2m + 1, then V = W ⊕ U ⊕ W^{∗}, where U is the 1-dimensional orthogonal complement to W ⊕ W^{∗}. The bilinear form ⟨.,.⟩ associated to Q induces a pairing between W and W^{∗}, which must be nondegenerate, because W and W^{∗} are totally isotropic subspaces and Q is nondegenerate. Hence W and W^{∗} are dual vector spaces.

More concretely, let a_{1}, ... a_{m} be a basis for W. Then there is a unique basis α_{1}, ... α_{m} of W^{∗} such that

$$\langle \alpha_i,a_j\rangle = \delta_{ij}.$$

If A is an m × m matrix, then A induces an endomorphism of W with respect to this basis and the transpose A^{T} induces a transformation of W^{∗} with

$$\langle Aw, w^* \rangle = \langle w,A^\mathrm{T} w^*\rangle$$

for all w in W and w^{∗} in W^{∗}. It follows that the endomorphism ρ_{A} of V, equal to A on W, −A^{T} on W^{∗} and zero on U (if n is odd), is skew,

$$\langle  \rho_A u, v \rangle = -\langle u,\rho_A v\rangle$$

for all u, v in V, and hence (see classical group) an element of so(n, C) ⊂ End(V).

Using the diagonal matrices in this construction defines a Cartan subalgebra h of so(n, C): the rank of so(n, C) is m, and the diagonal n × n matrices determine an m-dimensional abelian subalgebra.

Let ε_{1}, ... ε_{m} be the basis of h^{∗} such that, for a diagonal matrix A, ε_{k}(ρ_{A}) is the kth diagonal entry of A. Clearly this is a basis for h^{∗}. Since the bilinear form identifies so(n, C) with $\wedge^2 V$, explicitly,

$x \wedge y \mapsto \varphi_{x \wedge y}, \quad \varphi_{x \wedge y}(v) = \langle y, v\rangle x - \langle x, v\rangle y,\quad x \wedge y \in \wedge^2V,\quad x,y,v \in V, \quad \varphi_{x \wedge y} \in \mathfrak{so}(n, \mathbb{C}),$

it is now easy to construct the root system associated to h. The root spaces (simultaneous eigenspaces for the action of h) are spanned by the following elements:

$a_i\wedge a_j,\; i\neq j,$ with root (simultaneous eigenvalue) $\varepsilon_i + \varepsilon_j$
$a_i\wedge \alpha_j$ (which is in h if i = j) with root $\varepsilon_i - \varepsilon_j$
$\alpha_i\wedge \alpha_j,\; i\neq j,$ with root $-\varepsilon_i - \varepsilon_j,$

and, if n is odd, and u is a nonzero element of U,

$a_i\wedge u,$ with root $\varepsilon_i$
$\alpha_i\wedge u,$ with root $-\varepsilon_i.$

Thus, with respect to the basis ε_{1}, ... ε_{m}, the roots are the vectors in h^{∗} that are permutations of

$$(\pm 1,\pm 1, 0, 0, \dots, 0)$$

together with the permutations of

$$(\pm 1, 0, 0, \dots, 0)$$

if n = 2m + 1 is odd.

A system of positive roots is given by ε_{i} + ε_{j} (i ≠ j), ε_{i} − ε_{j} (i < j) and (for n odd) ε_{i}. The corresponding simple roots are

$$\varepsilon_1-\varepsilon_2, \varepsilon_2-\varepsilon_3, \ldots, \varepsilon_{m-1}-\varepsilon_m, \left\{\begin{matrix}
\varepsilon_{m-1}+\varepsilon_m& n=2m\\
\varepsilon_m & n=2m+1.
\end{matrix}\right.$$

The positive roots are nonnegative integer linear combinations of the simple roots.

=== Spin representations and their weights ===
One construction of the spin representations of so(n, C) uses the exterior algebra(s)

$S=\wedge^\bullet W$ and/or $S'=\wedge^\bullet W^*.$

There is an action of V on S such that for any element v = w + w^{∗} in W ⊕ W^{∗} and any ψ in S the action is given by:

$$v\cdot \psi = 2^{\frac{1}{2}}(w\wedge\psi+\iota(w^*)\psi),$$

where the second term is a contraction (interior multiplication) defined using the bilinear form, which pairs W and W^{∗}. This action respects the Clifford relations v^{2} = Q(v)1, and so induces a homomorphism from the Clifford algebra Cl_{n}C of V to End(S). A similar action can be defined on S′, so that both S and S′ are Clifford modules.

The Lie algebra so(n, C) is isomorphic to the complexified Lie algebra spin_{n}^{C} in Cl_{n}C via the mapping induced by the covering Spin(n) → SO(n)

$$v \wedge w \mapsto \tfrac14[v,w].$$

It follows that both S and S′ are representations of so(n, C). They are actually equivalent representations, so we focus on S.

The explicit description shows that the elements α_{i} ∧ a_{i} of the Cartan subalgebra h act on S by

$$(\alpha_i\wedge a_i) \cdot \psi = \tfrac14 (2^{\tfrac12})^{2} ( \iota(\alpha_i)(a_i\wedge\psi)-a_i\wedge(\iota(\alpha_i)\psi))
= \tfrac12 \psi - a_i\wedge(\iota(\alpha_i)\psi).$$

A basis for S is given by elements of the form

$$a_{i_1}\wedge a_{i_2}\wedge\cdots\wedge a_{i_k}$$

for 0 ≤ k ≤ m and i_{1} < ... < i_{k}. These clearly span weight spaces for the action of h: α_{i} ∧ a_{i} has eigenvalue −1/2 on the given basis vector if i = i_{j} for some j, and has eigenvalue 1/2 otherwise.

It follows that the weights of S are all possible combinations of

$$\bigl(\pm \tfrac12,\pm \tfrac12, \ldots \pm\tfrac12\bigr)$$

and each weight space is one-dimensional. Elements of S are called Dirac spinors.

When n is even, S is not an irreducible representation: $S_+=\wedge^{\mathrm{even}} W$ and $S_-=\wedge^{\mathrm{odd}} W$ are invariant subspaces. The weights divide into those with an even number of minus signs, and those with an odd number of minus signs. Both S_{+} and S_{−} are irreducible representations of dimension 2^{m−1} whose elements are called Weyl spinors. They are also known as chiral spin representations or half-spin representations. With respect to the positive root system above, the highest weights of S_{+} and S_{−} are

$\bigl(\tfrac12,\tfrac12, \ldots\tfrac12, \tfrac12\bigr)$ and $\bigl(\tfrac12,\tfrac12, \ldots\tfrac12, -\tfrac12\bigr)$

respectively. The Clifford action identifies Cl_{n}C with End(S) and the even subalgebra is identified with the endomorphisms preserving S_{+} and S_{−}. The other Clifford module S′ is isomorphic to S in this case.

When n is odd, S is an irreducible representation of so(n,C) of dimension 2^{m}: the Clifford action of a unit vector u ∈ U is given by

$$u\cdot \psi = \left\{\begin{matrix}
\psi&\hbox{if } \psi\in \wedge^{\mathrm{even}} W\\
-\psi&\hbox{if } \psi\in \wedge^{\mathrm{odd}} W
\end{matrix}\right.$$

and so elements of so(n,C) of the form u∧w or u∧w^{∗} do not preserve the even and odd parts of the exterior algebra of W. The highest weight of S is

$$\bigl(\tfrac12,\tfrac12, \ldots \tfrac12\bigr).$$

The Clifford action is not faithful on S: Cl_{n}C can be identified with End(S) ⊕ End(S′), where u acts with the opposite sign on S′. More precisely, the two representations are related by the parity involution α of Cl_{n}C (also known as the principal automorphism), which is the identity on the even subalgebra, and minus the identity on the odd part of Cl_{n}C. In other words, there is a linear isomorphism from S to S′, which identifies the action of A in Cl_{n}C on S with the action of α(A) on S′.

=== Bilinear forms ===
if λ is a weight of S, so is −λ. It follows that S is isomorphic to the dual representation S^{∗}.

When n = 2m + 1 is odd, the isomorphism B: S → S^{∗} is unique up to scale by Schur's lemma, since S is irreducible, and it defines a nondegenerate invariant bilinear form β on S via

$$\beta(\varphi,\psi) = B(\varphi)(\psi).$$

Here invariance means that

$$\beta(\xi\cdot\varphi,\psi) + \beta(\varphi,\xi\cdot\psi) = 0$$

for all ξ in so(n,C) and φ, ψ in S — in other words the action of ξ is skew with respect to β. In fact, more is true: S^{∗} is a representation of the opposite Clifford algebra, and therefore, since Cl_{n}C only has two nontrivial simple modules S and S′, related by the parity involution α, there is an antiautomorphism τ of Cl_{n}C such that

$$\quad\beta(A\cdot\varphi,\psi) = \beta(\varphi,\tau(A)\cdot\psi)\qquad (1)$$

for any A in Cl_{n}C. In fact τ is reversion (the antiautomorphism induced by the identity on V) for m even, and conjugation (the antiautomorphism induced by minus the identity on V) for m odd. These two antiautomorphisms are related by parity involution α, which is the automorphism induced by minus the identity on V. Both satisfy τ(ξ) = −ξ for ξ in so(n,C).

When n = 2m, the situation depends more sensitively upon the parity of m. For m even, a weight λ has an even number of minus signs if and only if −λ does; it follows that there are separate isomorphisms B_{±}: S_{±} → S_{±}^{∗} of each half-spin representation with its dual, each determined uniquely up to scale. These may be combined into an isomorphism B: S → S^{∗}. For m odd, λ is a weight of S_{+} if and only if −λ is a weight of S_{−}; thus there is an isomorphism from S_{+} to S_{−}^{∗}, again unique up to scale, and its transpose provides an isomorphism from S_{−} to S_{+}^{∗}. These may again be combined into an isomorphism B: S → S^{∗}.

For both m even and m odd, the freedom in the choice of B may be restricted to an overall scale by insisting that the bilinear form β corresponding to B satisfies (1), where τ is a fixed antiautomorphism (either reversion or conjugation).

=== Symmetry and the tensor square ===
The symmetry properties of β: S ⊗ S → C can be determined using Clifford algebras or representation theory. In fact much more can be said: the tensor square S ⊗ S must decompose into a direct sum of k-forms on V for various k, because its weights are all elements in h^{∗} whose components belong to {−1,0,1}. Now equivariant linear maps S ⊗ S → ∧^{k}V^{∗} correspond bijectively to invariant maps ∧^{k}V ⊗ S ⊗ S → C and nonzero such maps can be constructed via the inclusion of ∧^{k}V into the Clifford algebra. Furthermore, if β(φ,ψ) = ε β(ψ,φ) and τ has sign ε_{k} on ∧^{k}V then

$$\beta(A\cdot\varphi,\psi) = \varepsilon\varepsilon_k \beta(A\cdot\psi,\varphi)$$

for A in ∧^{k}V.

If n = 2m+1 is odd then it follows from Schur's Lemma that

$$S\otimes S \cong \bigoplus_{j=0}^{m} \wedge^{2j} V^*$$

(both sides have dimension 2^{2m} and the representations on the right are inequivalent). Because the symmetries are governed by an involution τ that is either conjugation or reversion, the symmetry of the ∧^{2j}V^{∗} component alternates with j. Elementary combinatorics gives

$$\sum_{j=0}^m (-1)^j \dim \wedge^{2j} \Complex^{2m+1} = (-1)^{\frac12 m(m+1)} 2^m = (-1)^{\frac12 m(m+1)}(\dim \mathrm S^2S-\dim \wedge^2 S)$$

and the sign determines which representations occur in S^{2}S and which occur in ∧^{2}S. In particular

$\beta(\phi,\psi)=(-1)^{\frac12 m(m+1)}\beta(\psi,\phi),$ and
$$\beta(v\cdot\phi,\psi) = (-1)^m(-1)^{\frac12 m(m+1)}\beta(v\cdot\psi,\phi) = (-1)^m \beta(\phi,v\cdot\psi)$$

for v ∈ V (which is isomorphic to ∧^{2m}V), confirming that τ is reversion for m even, and conjugation for m odd.

If n = 2m is even, then the analysis is more involved, but the result is a more refined decomposition: S^{2}S_{±}, ∧^{2}S_{±} and S_{+} ⊗ S_{−} can each be decomposed as a direct sum of k-forms (where for k = m there is a further decomposition into selfdual and antiselfdual m-forms).

The main outcome is a realisation of so(n,C) as a subalgebra of a classical Lie algebra on S, depending upon n modulo 8, according to the following table:

| n mod 8 | 0 | 1 | 2 | 3 | 4 | 5 | 6 | 7 |
| Spinor algebra | $\mathfrak{so}(S_+)\oplus\mathfrak{so}(S_-)$ | $\mathfrak{so}(S)$ | $\mathfrak{gl}(S_{\pm})$ | $\mathfrak{sp}(S)$ | $\mathfrak{sp}(S_+)\oplus\mathfrak{sp}(S_-)$ | $\mathfrak{sp}(S)$ | $\mathfrak{gl}(S_{\pm})$ | $\mathfrak{so}(S)$ |

For n ≤ 6, these embeddings are isomorphisms (onto sl rather than gl for n = 6):

$$\mathfrak{so}(2,\mathbb C) \cong \mathfrak{gl}(1,\mathbb C)\qquad(=\mathbb C)$$
$$\mathfrak{so}(3,\mathbb C) \cong \mathfrak{sp}(2,\mathbb C)\qquad(=\mathfrak{sl}(2,\mathbb C))$$
$$\mathfrak{so}(4,\mathbb C) \cong \mathfrak{sp}(2,\mathbb C)\oplus\mathfrak{sp}(2,\mathbb C)$$
$$\mathfrak{so}(5,\mathbb C) \cong \mathfrak{sp}(4,\mathbb C)$$
$$\mathfrak{so}(6,\mathbb C) \cong \mathfrak{sl}(4,\mathbb C).$$

== Real representations ==
The complex spin representations of so(n,C) yield real representations S of so(p,q) by restricting the action to the real subalgebras. However, there are additional "reality" structures that are invariant under the action of the real Lie algebras. These come in three types.

1. There is an invariant complex antilinear map r: S → S with r^{2} = id_{S}. The fixed point set of r is then a real vector subspace S_{R} of S with S_{R} ⊗ C = S. This is called a real structure.
2. There is an invariant complex antilinear map j: S → S with j^{2} = −id_{S}. It follows that the triple i, j and k:=ij make S into a quaternionic vector space S_{H}. This is called a quaternionic structure.
3. There is an invariant complex antilinear map b: S → S^{∗} that is invertible. This defines a pseudohermitian bilinear form on S and is called a hermitian structure.

The type of structure invariant under so(p,q) depends only on the signature p − q modulo 8, and is given by the following table.

| p−q mod 8 | 0 | 1 | 2 | 3 | 4 | 5 | 6 | 7 |
| Structure | R + R | R | C | H | H + H | H | C | R |

Here R, C and H denote real, hermitian and quaternionic structures respectively, and R + R and H + H indicate that the half-spin representations both admit real or quaternionic structures respectively.

=== Description and tables ===
To complete the description of real representation, we must describe how these structures interact with the invariant bilinear forms. Since n = p + q ≅ p − q mod 2, there are two cases: the dimension and signature are both even, and the dimension and signature are both odd.

The odd case is simpler, there is only one complex spin representation S, and hermitian structures do not occur. Apart from the trivial case n = 1, S is always even-dimensional, say dim S = 2N. The real forms of so(2N,C) are so(K,L) with K + L = 2N and so^{∗}(N,H), while the real forms of sp(2N,C) are sp(2N,R) and sp(K,L) with K + L = N. The presence of a Clifford action of V on S forces K = L in both cases unless pq = 0, in which case KL=0, which is denoted simply so(2N) or sp(N). Hence the odd spin representations may be summarized in the following table.

| | n mod 8 | 1, 7 | 3, 5 |
| p−q mod 8 | | so(2N,C) | sp(2N,C) |
|---|---|---|---|
| 1, 7 | R | so(N,N) or so(2N) | sp(2N,R) |
| 3, 5 | H | so^{∗}(N,H) | sp(N/2,N/2)^{†} or sp(N) |

(†) N is even for n > 3 and for n = 3, this is sp(1).

The even-dimensional case is similar. For n > 2, the complex half-spin representations are even-dimensional. We have additionally to deal with hermitian structures and the real forms of sl(2N, C), which are sl(2N, R), su(K, L) with K + L = 2N, and sl(N, H). The resulting even spin representations are summarized as follows.

| | n mod 8 | 0 | 2, 6 | 4 |
| p-q mod 8 | | so(2N,C)+so(2N,C) | sl(2N,C) | sp(2N,C)+sp(2N,C) |
|---|---|---|---|---|
| 0 | R+R | so(N,N)+so(N,N)^{∗} | sl(2N,R) | sp(2N,R)+sp(2N,R) |
| 2, 6 | C | so(2N,C) | su(N,N) | sp(2N,C) |
| 4 | H+H | so^{∗}(N,H)+so^{∗}(N,H) | sl(N,H) | sp(N/2,N/2)+sp(N/2,N/2)^{†} |

(*) For pq = 0, we have instead so(2N) + so(2N)

(†) N is even for n > 4 and for pq = 0 (which includes n = 4 with N = 1), we have instead sp(N) + sp(N)

The low-dimensional isomorphisms in the complex case have the following real forms.

| Euclidean signature | Minkowskian signature | Other signatures | |
| $\mathfrak{so}(2)\cong \mathfrak{u}(1)$ | $\mathfrak{so}(1,1)\cong \mathbb R$ | | |
| $\mathfrak{so}(3)\cong \mathfrak{sp}(1)$ | $\mathfrak{so}(2,1)\cong \mathfrak{sl}(2,\mathbb R)$ | | |
| $\mathfrak{so}(4)\cong \mathfrak{sp}(1)\oplus\mathfrak{sp}(1)$ | $\mathfrak{so}(3,1)\cong \mathfrak{sl}(2,\mathbb C)$ | $\mathfrak{so}(2,2)\cong \mathfrak{sl}(2,\mathbb R)\oplus\mathfrak{sl}(2,\mathbb R)$ | |
| $\mathfrak{so}(5)\cong \mathfrak{sp}(2)$ | $\mathfrak{so}(4,1)\cong \mathfrak{sp}(1,1)$ | $\mathfrak{so}(3,2)\cong \mathfrak{sp}(4,\mathbb R)$ | |
| $\mathfrak{so}(6)\cong \mathfrak{su}(4)$ | $\mathfrak{so}(5,1)\cong \mathfrak{sl}(2,\mathbb H)$ | $\mathfrak{so}(4,2)\cong \mathfrak{su}(2,2)$ | $\mathfrak{so}(3,3)\cong \mathfrak{sl}(4,\mathbb R)$ |

The only special isomorphisms of real Lie algebras missing from this table are $\mathfrak{so}^*(3,\mathbb H) \cong \mathfrak{su}(3,1)$ and $\mathfrak{so}^*(4,\mathbb H)\cong\mathfrak{so}(6,2).$
