= Garnir relations =

In mathematics, the Garnir relations give a way of expressing a basis of the Specht modules V_{λ} in terms of standard polytabloids.

== Specht modules in terms of polytabloids ==
Given an integer partition λ of n, one has the Specht module V_{λ}. In characteristic 0, this is an irreducible representation of the symmetric group S_{n}. One can construct V_{λ} explicitly in terms of polytabloids as follows:

- Start with the permutation representation of S_{n} acting on all Young tableaux of shape λ, which are fillings of the Young diagram of λ with numbers 1, 2, ... n, each used once (note that we do not require the tableaux to be standard, there are no conditions imposed along rows or columns). The group S_{n} acts by permuting the positions in each tableau (for instance there is a cyclic permutation the cycles the entries of the first row one place forward).
- A Young tabloid is an orbit of Young tableaux under the action of the row permutations, the subgroup of S_{n} of permutations that permute the positions in each row separately (this "Young subgroup" is a product of symmetric groups, one for each row). The Young tabloid of T is denoted {T}.
- Now consider the free Abelian group of polytabloids, the formal linear combinations with integer coefficients of Young tabloids. To any Young tableau T one associates a polytabloid e_{T} as follows. One first forms the orbit of T under the action of the group ${\rm col}(T)$ of column permutations (another Young subgroup, defined similarly to row permutations but permuting positions within individual columns only). Then, writing the result of action on a tableau T by a column permutation σ as Tσ, defines:

$$e_T = \sum_{\sigma \in {\rm col}(T)} \sgn(\sigma) \{T \sigma\}.$$

$\{T\}=\{T'\}$ does not imply $e_T=e_{T'}$, since the actions of row and column permutations do not commute in general.

- The Specht module V_{λ} is then the subspace of the space of all polytabloids spanned by the polytabloids e_{T} for all Young tableaux T of shape λ.

== Straightening polytabloids and the Garnir elements ==
The above construction gives an explicit description of the Specht module V_{λ}. However, the polytabloids associated to different Young tableaux are not necessarily linearly independent, indeed, the dimension of V_{λ} is exactly the number of standard Young tableaux of shape λ. In fact, the polytabloids associated to standard Young tableaux span V_{λ}; to express other polytabloids in terms of them, one uses a straightening algorithm.

Given a Young tableau S, we construct the polytabloid e_{S} as above. Without loss of generality, all columns of S are increasing, otherwise we could instead start with the modified Young tableau with increasing columns, whose polytabloid will differ at most by a sign. S is then said to not have any column descents. We want to express e_{S} as a linear combination of standard polytabloids, i.e. polytabloids associated to standard Young tableaux. To do this, we would like permutations π_{i} such that in all tableaux Sπ_{i}, a row descent has been eliminated, with $S(1 + \sum_i \pi_i) = 0$. This then expresses S in terms of polytabloids that are closer to being standard. The permutations that achieve this are the Garnir elements.

Suppose we want to eliminate a row descent from box $(x,y)$ to box $(x+1,y)$ in the Young tableau. We pick a subset $A = \{(x,y+k) \ | \ k \geq 0\}$ and a subset $B = \{(x+1,y-k) \ | \ k \geq 0\}$ of the boxes like the red and blue sets in the following diagram:

Then the Garnir element $g_{A,B}$ is defined to be $\sum_i \sgn(\pi_i) \pi_i$, where the π_{i} are the permutations of the entries of the boxes of $A \cup B$ that keep both subsets A and B without column descents.

== Example ==
Consider the following Young tableau:

There is a row descent in the second row, so we choose the subsets A and B as indicated, which gives us the following:

This gives us the Garnir element $g_{A,B} = 1 - (4 5) + (2 4 5) + (4 6 5) - (2 4 6 5) + (2 5) (4 6)$. This allows us to remove the row descent in the second row, but this has also introduced other descents in other places. But there is a way in which all tableaux obtained like this are closer to being standard, this is measured by a dominance order on polytabloids. Therefore, one can repeatedly apply this procedure to straighten a polytabloid, eventually writing it as a linear combination of standard polytabloids, showing that the Specht module is spanned by the standard polytabloids. As they are also linearly independent, they form a basis of this module.

== Other interpretations ==
There is a similar description for the irreducible representations of GL_{n}. In that case, one can consider the Weyl modules associated to a partition λ, which can be described in terms of bideterminants. One has a similar straightening algorithm, but this time in terms of semistandard Young tableaux.
