= Symplectic representation =

In mathematical field of representation theory, a symplectic representation is a representation of a group or a Lie algebra on a symplectic vector space (V, ω) which preserves the symplectic form ω. Here ω is a nondegenerate skew symmetric bilinear form

$$\omega\colon V\times V \to \mathbb F$$

where F is the field of scalars. A representation of a group G preserves ω if

$$\omega(g\cdot v,g\cdot w)= \omega(v,w)$$

for all g in G and v, w in V, whereas a representation of a Lie algebra g preserves ω if

$$\omega(\xi\cdot v,w)+\omega(v,\xi\cdot w)=0$$

for all ξ in g and v, w in V. Thus a representation of G or g is equivalently a group or Lie algebra homomorphism from G or g to the symplectic group Sp(V,ω) or its Lie algebra sp(V,ω)

If G is a compact group (for example, a finite group), and F is the field of complex numbers, then by introducing a compatible unitary structure (which exists by an averaging argument), one can show that any complex symplectic representation is a quaternionic representation. Quaternionic representations of finite or compact groups are often called symplectic representations, and may be identified using the Frobenius–Schur indicator.
