= Complex representation =

In mathematics, a complex representation is a representation of a group (or that of Lie algebra) on a complex vector space. Sometimes (for example in physics), the term complex representation is reserved for a representation on a complex vector space that is neither real nor pseudoreal (quaternionic). In other words, the group elements are expressed as complex matrices, and the complex conjugate of a complex representation is a different, non-equivalent representation. For compact groups, the Frobenius-Schur indicator can be used to tell whether a representation is real, complex, or pseudo-real.

For example, the N-dimensional fundamental representation of SU(N) for N greater than two is a complex representation whose complex conjugate is often called the antifundamental representation.
