= Symplectic vector space =

Mathematical concept

In mathematics, a symplectic vector space is a vector space $V$ over a field $F$ (for example the real numbers $\mathbb{R}$) equipped with a symplectic bilinear form.

A symplectic bilinear form is a mapping $\omega : V \times V \to F$ that is

Bilinear
Linear in each argument separately;
Alternating
$\omega(v, v)=0$ holds for all $v \in V$; and
Non-degenerate
$\omega(v, u) = 0$ for all $v \in V$ implies that $u = 0$.

If the underlying field has characteristic not 2, alternation is equivalent to skew-symmetry. If the characteristic is 2, the skew-symmetry is implied by, but does not imply alternation. In this case every symplectic form is a symmetric form, but not vice versa.

Working in a fixed basis, $\omega$ can be represented by a matrix. The conditions above are equivalent to this matrix being skew-symmetric, nonsingular, and hollow (all diagonal entries are zero). This should not be confused with a symplectic matrix, which represents a symplectic transformation of the space. If $V$ is finite-dimensional, then its dimension must necessarily be even since every skew-symmetric, hollow matrix of odd size has determinant zero. Notice that the condition that the matrix be hollow is redundant unless the characteristic of the field is 2. A symplectic form behaves quite differently from a symmetric form such as the scalar product on Euclidean vector spaces.

== Standard symplectic space ==
The standard symplectic space is $\mathbb{R}^{2n}$ with the symplectic form given by a nonsingular, skew-symmetric matrix. Typically $\omega$ is chosen to be the block matrix

$$\omega = \begin{bmatrix} 0 & I_n \\ -I_n & 0 \end{bmatrix}$$

where $I_n$ is the $n\times n$ identity matrix. In terms of basis vectors $(x_1,\cdots,x_n,y_1,\cdots,y_n)$:

$$\begin{align}
\omega(x_i, y_j) = -\omega(y_j, x_i) &= \delta_{ij}, \\
\omega(x_i, x_j) =  \omega(y_i, y_j) &= 0.
\end{align}$$

A modified version of the Gram–Schmidt process shows that any finite-dimensional symplectic vector space has a basis such that $\omega$ takes this form, often called a Darboux basis or symplectic basis.

Sketch of process:

Start with an arbitrary basis $v_1, ..., v_n$, and represent the dual of each basis vector by the dual basis: $\omega(v_i, \cdot) = \sum_j \omega(v_i, v_j) v_j^*$. This gives us a $n\times n$ matrix with entries $\omega(v_i, v_j)$. Solve for its null space. Now for any $(\lambda_1, ..., \lambda_n)$ in the null space, we have $\sum_i \omega(v_i, \cdot) = 0$, so the null space gives us the degenerate subspace $V_0$.

Now arbitrarily pick a complementary $W$ such that $V = V_0 \oplus W$, and let $w_1, ..., w_m$ be a basis of $W$. Since $\omega(w_1, \cdot) \neq 0$, and $\omega(w_1, w_1) = 0$, WLOG $\omega(w_1, w_2 ) \neq 0$. Now scale $w_2$ so that $\omega(w_1, w_2) =1$. Then define $w' = w - \omega(w, w_2) w_1 + \omega(w, w_1) w_2$ for each of $w = w_3, w_4, ..., w_m$. Iterate.

Notice that this method applies for symplectic vector space over any field, not just the field of real numbers.

Case of real or complex field:

When the space is over the field of real numbers, then we can modify the modified Gram-Schmidt process as follows: Start the same way. Let $w_1, ..., w_m$ be an orthonormal basis (with respect to the usual inner product on $\R^n$) of $W$. Since $\omega(w_1, \cdot) \neq 0$, and $\omega(w_1, w_1) = 0$, WLOG $\omega(w_1, w_2 ) \neq 0$. Now multiply $w_2$ by a sign, so that $\omega(w_1, w_2) \geq 0$. Then define $w' = w - \omega(w, w_2) w_1 + \omega(w, w_1) w_2$ for each of $w = w_3, w_4, ..., w_m$, then scale each $w'$ so that it has norm one. Iterate.

Similarly, for the field of complex numbers, we may choose a unitary basis. This proves the spectral theory of antisymmetric matrices.

=== Lagrangian form ===
There is another way to interpret this standard symplectic form. Since the model space $\mathbb{R}^{2n}$ used above carries much canonical structure which might easily lead to misinterpretation, we will use "anonymous" vector spaces instead. Let V be a real vector space of dimension n and V^{∗} its dual space. Now consider the direct sum W = V ⊕ V^{∗} of these spaces equipped with the following form:

$$\omega(x \oplus \eta, y \oplus \xi) = \xi(x) - \eta(y).$$

Now choose any basis (v_{1}, ..., v_{n}) of V and consider its dual basis

$$\left(v^*_1, \ldots, v^*_n\right).$$

We can interpret the basis vectors as lying in W if we write x_{i} = (v_{i}, 0) and y_{i} = (0, v_{i}^{∗}). Taken together, these form a complete basis of W,

$$(x_1, \ldots, x_n, y_1, \ldots, y_n).$$

The form ω defined here can be shown to have the same properties as in the beginning of this section. On the other hand, every symplectic structure is isomorphic to one of the form V ⊕ V^{∗}. The subspace V is not unique, and a choice of subspace V is called a polarization. The subspaces that give such an isomorphism are called Lagrangian subspaces or simply Lagrangians.

Explicitly, given a Lagrangian subspace as defined below, then a choice of basis (x_{1}, ..., x_{n}) defines a dual basis for a complement, by ω(x_{i}, y_{j}) = δ_{ij}.

=== Analogy with complex structures ===
Just as every symplectic structure is isomorphic to one of the form V ⊕ V^{∗}, every complex structure on a vector space is isomorphic to one of the form V ⊕ V. Using these structures, the tangent bundle of an n-manifold, considered as a 2n-manifold, has an almost complex structure, and the cotangent bundle of an n-manifold, considered as a 2n-manifold, has a symplectic structure: T_{∗}(T^{∗}M)_{p} = T_{p}(M) ⊕ (T_{p}(M))^{∗}.

The complex analog to a Lagrangian subspace is a real subspace, a subspace whose complexification is the whole space: W = V ⊕ J V. As can be seen from the standard symplectic form above, every symplectic form on R^{2n} is isomorphic to the imaginary part of the standard complex (Hermitian) inner product on C^{n} (with the convention of the first argument being anti-linear).

== Volume form ==
Let ω be an alternating bilinear form on an n-dimensional real vector space V, ω ∈ Λ^{2}(V). Then ω is non-degenerate if and only if n is even and ω^{n/2} = ω ∧ ... ∧ ω is a volume form. A volume form on a n-dimensional vector space V is a non-zero multiple of the n-form e_{1}^{∗} ∧ ... ∧ e_{n}^{∗} where e_{1}, e_{2}, ..., e_{n} is a basis of V.

For the standard basis defined in the previous section, we have

$$\omega^{\frac{n}{2}} = (-1)^\frac{n(n-1)}{8} x^*_1 \wedge \dotsb \wedge x^*_n \wedge y^*_1 \wedge \dotsb \wedge y^*_n.$$

By reordering, one can write

$$\omega^{\frac{n}{2}} = x^*_1 \wedge y^*_1 \wedge \dotsb \wedge x^*_n \wedge y^*_n.$$

Authors variously define ω^{n/2} or (−1)^{n(n-1)/8}ω^{n/2} as the standard volume form. An occasional factor of n! may also appear, depending on whether the definition of the alternating product contains a factor of n! or not. The volume form defines an orientation on the symplectic vector space (V, ω).

== Symplectic map ==
Suppose that (V, ω) and (W, ρ) are symplectic vector spaces. Then a linear map f : V → W is called a symplectic map if the pullback preserves the symplectic form, i.e. f^{∗}ρ = ω, where the pullback form is defined by (f^{∗}ρ)(u, v) = ρ(f(u), f(v)). Symplectic maps are volume- and orientation-preserving.

== Symplectic group ==
If V = W, then a symplectic map is called a linear symplectic transformation of V. In particular, in this case one has that ω(f(u), f(v)) = ω(u, v), and so the linear transformation f preserves the symplectic form. The set of all symplectic transformations forms a group and in particular a Lie group, called the symplectic group and denoted by Sp(V) or sometimes Sp(V, ω). In matrix form symplectic transformations are given by symplectic matrices.

== Subspaces ==
Let W be a linear subspace of V. Define the symplectic complement of W to be the subspace

$$W^\perp = \{v \in V \mid \omega(v,w) = 0 \mbox{ for all } w \in W\}.$$

The symplectic complement satisfies:

$$\begin{align}
\left(W^\perp\right)^\perp &= W \\
\dim W + \dim W^\perp &= \dim V.
\end{align}$$

However, unlike orthogonal complements, W^{⊥} ∩ W need not be 0. We distinguish four cases:

- W is symplectic if W^{⊥} ∩ W = {0}. This is true if and only if ω restricts to a nondegenerate form on W. A symplectic subspace with the restricted form is a symplectic vector space in its own right.
- W is isotropic if W ⊆ W^{⊥}. This is true if and only if ω restricts to 0 on W. Any one-dimensional subspace is isotropic.
- W is coisotropic if W^{⊥} ⊆ W. W is coisotropic if and only if ω descends to a nondegenerate form on the quotient space W/W^{⊥}. Equivalently W is coisotropic if and only if W^{⊥} is isotropic. Any codimension-one subspace is coisotropic.
- W is Lagrangian if W = W^{⊥}. A subspace is Lagrangian if and only if it is both isotropic and coisotropic. In a finite-dimensional vector space, a Lagrangian subspace is an isotropic one whose dimension is half that of V. Every isotropic subspace can be extended to a Lagrangian one.

Referring to the canonical vector space R^{2n} above,

- the subspace spanned by {x_{1}, y_{1}} is symplectic
- the subspace spanned by {x_{1}, x_{2}} is isotropic
- the subspace spanned by {x_{1}, x_{2}, ..., x_{n}, y_{1}} is coisotropic
- the subspace spanned by {x_{1}, x_{2}, ..., x_{n}} is Lagrangian.

The complement operation exchanges isotropic and coisotropic subspaces of complementary dimensions. In particular, any line is complemented to a hyperplane that contains it, then complemented back.

All nonzero vectors are the same, in that any two nonzero vectors are related by a linear symplectic transformation of V. That is, the only symplectic invariant of a vector is it being nonzero. Similarly, given vectors $u, v, u', v'$, if $\omega(u \wedge v) = \omega(u' \wedge v')$, then there exists a symplectic transformation that maps $(u, v)$ to $(u', v')$. That is, the only symplectic invariant of an ordered pair of vectors is its symplectic area.

== Heisenberg group ==
A Heisenberg group can be defined for any symplectic vector space, and this is the typical way that Heisenberg groups arise.

A vector space can be thought of as a commutative Lie group (under addition), or equivalently as a commutative Lie algebra, meaning with trivial Lie bracket. The Heisenberg group is a central extension of such a commutative Lie group/algebra: the symplectic form defines the commutation, analogously to the canonical commutation relations (CCR), and a Darboux basis corresponds to canonical coordinates – in physics terms, to momentum operators and position operators.

Indeed, by the Stone–von Neumann theorem, every representation satisfying the CCR (every representation of the Heisenberg group) is of this form, or more properly unitarily conjugate to the standard one.

Further, the group algebra of (the dual to) a vector space is the symmetric algebra, and the group algebra of the Heisenberg group (of the dual) is the Weyl algebra: one can think of the central extension as corresponding to quantization or deformation.

Formally, the symmetric algebra of a vector space V over a field F is the group algebra of the dual, Sym(V) := F[V^{∗}], and the Weyl algebra is the group algebra of the (dual) Heisenberg group W(V) = F[H(V^{∗})]. Since passing to group algebras is a contravariant functor, the central extension map H(V) → V becomes an inclusion Sym(V) → W(V).

== See also ==
- A symplectic manifold is a smooth manifold with a smoothly-varying symplectic form on each tangent space that also satisfies a local integrability condition.
- Maslov index
- A symplectic bundle is a vector bundle equipped with a smoothly-varying symplectic form on each fiber.
- A symplectic representation is a group representation where each group element acts as a symplectic transformation.
