= Trivial representation =

Universal representation of a group in terms of its own multiplication

In the mathematical field of representation theory, a trivial representation is a representation (V, φ) of a group G on which all elements of G act as the identity mapping of V. A trivial representation of an associative or Lie algebra is an (Lie) algebra representation for which all elements of the algebra act as the zero linear map (endomorphism) which sends every element of V to the zero vector.

For any group or Lie algebra, an irreducible trivial representation always exists over any field, and is one-dimensional, hence unique up to isomorphism. The same is true for associative algebras unless one restricts attention to unital algebras and unital representations.

Although the trivial representation is constructed in such a way as to make its properties seem tautologous, it is a fundamental object of the theory. A subrepresentation is equivalent to a trivial representation, for example, if it consists of invariant vectors; so that searching for such subrepresentations is the whole topic of invariant theory.

The trivial character is the character that takes the value of one for all group elements.
