= Fundamental representation =

Aspect of mathematical representation theory

In representation theory of Lie groups and Lie algebras, a fundamental representation is an irreducible finite-dimensional representation of a semisimple Lie group or Lie algebra whose highest weight is a fundamental weight. For example, the defining module of a classical Lie group is a fundamental representation. Any finite-dimensional irreducible representation of a semisimple Lie group or Lie algebra can be constructed from the fundamental representations by a procedure due to Élie Cartan. Thus in a certain sense, the fundamental representations are the elementary building blocks for arbitrary finite-dimensional representations.

== Examples ==
- In the case of the general linear group, all fundamental representations are exterior products of the defining module.
- In the case of the special unitary group SU(n), the n − 1 fundamental representations are the wedge products $\operatorname{Alt}^k\ {\mathbb C}^n$ consisting of the alternating tensors, for k = 1, 2, ..., n − 1.
- The spin representation of the twofold cover of an odd orthogonal group, the odd spin group, and the two half-spin representations of the twofold cover of an even orthogonal group, the even spinor group, are fundamental representations that cannot be realized in the space of tensors.
- The adjoint representation of the simple Lie group of type E_{8} is a fundamental representation.

== Explanation ==
The irreducible representations of a simply-connected compact Lie group are indexed by their highest weights. These weights are the lattice points in an orthant Q_{+} in the weight lattice of the Lie group consisting of the dominant integral weights. It can be proved that there exists a set of fundamental weights, indexed by the vertices of the Dynkin diagram, such that any dominant integral weight is a non-negative integer linear combination of the fundamental weights. The corresponding irreducible representations are the fundamental representations of the Lie group. From the expansion of a dominant weight in terms of the fundamental weights one can take a corresponding tensor product of the fundamental representations and extract one copy of the irreducible representation corresponding to that dominant weight.

== Other uses ==
In mathematical physics, the term fundamental representation is also used to refer to the defining representation of a matrix Lie group or matrix Lie algebra, that is, its standard representation as a subgroup of $\operatorname{GL}(n,\C)$ or subalgebra of $\mathfrak{gl}(n,\mathbb{C})$. The complex conjugate of the fundamental representation is known as the antifundamental (or anti-fundamental) representation. Although the distinction between the fundamental and the antifundamental representation is a matter of convention, these two are often non-equivalent, because each of them is a complex representation.
