= Affine representation =

In mathematics, an affine representation of a topological Lie group G on an affine space A is a continuous (smooth) group homomorphism from G to the automorphism group of A, the affine group Aff(A). Similarly, an affine representation of a Lie algebra g on A is a Lie algebra homomorphism from g to the Lie algebra aff(A) of the affine group of A.

An example is the action of the Euclidean group E(n) on the Euclidean space E^{n}.

Since the affine group in dimension n is a matrix group in dimension n + 1, an affine representation may be thought of as a particular kind of linear representation. We may ask whether a given affine representation has a fixed point in the given affine space A. If it does, we may take that as origin and regard A as a vector space; in that case, we actually have a linear representation in dimension n. This reduction depends on a group cohomology question, in general.

== See also ==
- Group action
- Projective representation
