= Chevalley restriction theorem =

In the mathematical theory of Lie groups, the Chevalley restriction theorem describes functions on a Lie algebra which are invariant under the action of a Lie group in terms of functions on a Cartan subalgebra.

== Statement ==
Chevalley's theorem requires the following notation:

	assumption	example
G	complex connected semisimple Lie group	SL_{n}, the special linear group
$\mathfrak g$	the Lie algebra of G	$\mathfrak{sl}_n$, the Lie algebra of matrices with trace zero
$\mathbb C[\mathfrak g]^G$	the polynomial functions on $\mathfrak g$ which are invariant under the adjoint G-action	
$\mathfrak h$	a Cartan subalgebra of $\mathfrak g$	the subalgebra of diagonal matrices with trace 0
W	the Weyl group of G	the symmetric group S_{n}
$\mathbb C[\mathfrak h]^W$	the polynomial functions on $\mathfrak h$ which are invariant under the natural action of W	polynomials f on the space $\{x_1, \dots, x_n , \sum x_i =0 \}$ which are invariant under all permutations of the x_{i}

Chevalley's theorem asserts that the restriction of polynomial functions induces an isomorphism

$$\mathbb C[\mathfrak g]^{G} \cong \mathbb C[\mathfrak h]^{W}$$.

== Proofs ==
Humphreys (1980) gives a proof using properties of representations of highest weight. Chriss & Ginzburg (2010) give a proof of Chevalley's theorem exploiting the geometric properties of the map $\widetilde \mathfrak g := G \times_B \mathfrak b \to \mathfrak g$.

This theorem in fact more generally holds for any reductive Lie algebra, and can also be proved directly in the case that $G = \mathrm{GL}_n$. In this case, the Cartan subalgebra $\mathfrak{t}$ can be identified with diagonal matrices, and the Weyl group can be identified with the symmetric group acting on diagonal matrices by permutations. Therefore, $\mathbb{C}[\mathfrak{t}] \cong \mathbb{C}[x_1, ..., x_n]$ and $\mathbb{C}[\mathfrak{t}]^W$ can be identified with the subring of $\mathbb{C}[\mathfrak{t}]$ generated by $e_1, ..., e_n$ where each $e_i$ is an elementary symmetric polynomial.

Identify $\mathfrak g$ with the set of $n \times n$ matrices. For injectivity, if we are given a $G$-invariant polynomial on $\mathfrak g$ which vanishes on the set of diagonal matrices, by $G$-invariance, this polynomial vanishes on any matrix which is conjugate to a diagonal matrix. Since these elements are Zariski dense in $\mathfrak g$, this polynomial vanishes on a Zariski dense open subset of $\mathfrak g$ and thus must itself be the zero polynomial.

For surjectivity, it of course suffices to show that each $e_i$ lies in the image of this map. Using Newton's identities and an inductive argument, it suffices to prove that the function $x_1^i + ... + x_n^i$ lies in the image of this map for every $i \in \{1, ..., n\}$. However, in this case, one can explicitly construct an invariant function which restricts to $x_1^i + ... + x_n^i$ on diagonal matrices: it is given by the function $A \mapsto \mathrm{trace}(A^i)$.
