= Quaternionic structure =

Axiomatic system in mathematics

In mathematics, a quaternionic structure or Q-structure is an axiomatic system that abstracts the concept of a quaternion algebra over a field.

A quaternionic structure is a triple (G, Q, q) where G is an elementary abelian group of exponent 2 with a distinguished element −1, Q is a pointed set with distinguished element 1, and q is a symmetric surjection G×G → Q satisfying axioms

$$\begin{align}\text{1.} \quad &q(a,(-1)a) = 1,\\
\text{2.} \quad &q(a,b) = q(a,c) \Leftrightarrow q(a,bc) = 1,\\
\text{3.} \quad &q(a,b) = q(c,d) \Rightarrow \exists x\mid q(a,b) = q(a,x), q(c,d) = q(c,x)\end{align}.$$

Every field F gives rise to a Q-structure by taking G to be F^{∗}/F^{∗2}, Q the set of Brauer classes of quaternion algebras in the Brauer group of F with the split quaternion algebra as distinguished element and q(a,b) the quaternion algebra (a,b)_{F}.
