= Subrepresentation =

In representation theory, a subrepresentation of a representation $(\pi, V)$ of a group G is a representation $(\pi|_W, W)$ such that W is a vector subspace of V and $\pi|_W(g) = \pi(g)|_W$.

A nonzero finite-dimensional representation always contains a nonzero subrepresentation that is irreducible, the fact seen by induction on dimension. This fact is generally false for infinite-dimensional representations.

If $(\pi, V)$ is a representation of G, then there is the trivial subrepresentation:

$$V^G = \{ v \in V \mid \pi(g)v = v, \, g \in G \}.$$

If $f: V \to W$ is an equivariant map between two representations, then its kernel is a subrepresentation of $V$ and its image is a subrepresentation of $W$.
