= Complex conjugate representation =

In mathematics, if G is a group and Π is a representation of it over the complex vector space V, then the complex conjugate representation Π̅ is defined over the complex conjugate vector space V̅ as follows:

Π̅(g) is the conjugate of Π(g) for all g in G.

Π̅ is also a representation, as one may check explicitly.

If g is a real Lie algebra and π is a representation of it over the vector space V, then the conjugate representation π̅ is defined over the conjugate vector space V̅ as follows:

π̅(X) is the conjugate of π(X) for all X in g.

π̅ is also a representation, as one may check explicitly.

If two real Lie algebras have the same complexification, and we have a complex representation of the complexified Lie algebra, their conjugate representations are still going to be different. See spinor for some examples associated with spinor representations of the spin groups Spin(p + q) and Spin(p, q).

If $\mathfrak{g}$ is a *-Lie algebra (a complex Lie algebra with a * operation which is compatible with the Lie bracket),

π̅(X) is the conjugate of −π(X*) for all X in g

For a finite-dimensional unitary representation, the dual representation and the conjugate representation coincide. This also holds for pseudounitary representations.

== See also ==
- Dual representation
