= Real structure =

Mathematics concept

In mathematics, a real structure on a complex vector space is a way to decompose the complex vector space in the direct sum of two real vector spaces. The prototype of such a structure is the field of complex numbers itself, considered as a complex vector space over itself and with the conjugation map $\sigma: {\mathbb C} \to {\mathbb C}\,$, with $\sigma (z)={\bar z}$, giving the "canonical" real structure on ${\mathbb C}\,$, that is ${\mathbb C}={\mathbb R}\oplus i{\mathbb R}\,$.

The conjugation map is antilinear: $\sigma (\lambda z)={\bar \lambda}\sigma(z)\,$ and $\sigma (z_1+z_2)=\sigma(z_1)+\sigma(z_2)\,$.

== Vector space ==
A real structure on a complex vector space V is an antilinear involution $\sigma: V \to V$. A real structure defines a real subspace $V_{\mathbb{R}} \subset V$, its fixed locus, and the natural map

$$V_{\mathbb R} \otimes_{\mathbb{R}} {\mathbb C} \to V$$

is an isomorphism. Conversely any vector space that is the complexification of a real vector space has a natural real structure.

One first notes that every complex space V has a realification obtained by taking the same vectors as in the original set and restricting the scalars to be real. If $t\in V\,$ and $t\neq 0$ then the vectors $t\,$ and $it\,$ are linearly independent in the realification of V. Hence:

$$\dim_{\mathbb R}V = 2\dim_{\mathbb C}V$$

Naturally, one would wish to represent V as the direct sum of two real vector spaces, the "real and imaginary parts of V". There is no canonical way of doing this: such a splitting is an additional real structure in V. It may be introduced as follows. Let $\sigma: V \to V\,$ be an antilinear map such that $\sigma\circ\sigma=id_{V}\,$, that is an antilinear involution of the complex space V. Any vector $v\in V\,$ can be written ${v = v^{+} + v^{-}}\,$, where $v^+ ={1\over {2}}(v+\sigma v)$ and $v^- ={1\over {2}}(v-\sigma v)\,$.

Therefore, one gets a direct sum of vector spaces $V=V^{+}\oplus V^{-}\,$ where:

$V^{+}=\{v\in V | \sigma v = v\}$ and $V^{-}=\{v\in V | \sigma v = -v\}\,$.

Both sets $V^+\,$ and $V^-\,$ are real vector spaces. The linear map $K: V^+ \to V^-\,$, where $K(t)=it\,$, is an isomorphism of real vector spaces, whence:

$$\dim_{\mathbb R}V^+ = \dim_{\mathbb R}V^- = \dim_{\mathbb C}V\,$$.

The first factor $V^+\,$ is also denoted by $V_{\mathbb{R}}\,$ and is left invariant by $\sigma\,$, that is $\sigma(V_{\mathbb{R}})\subset V_{\mathbb{R}}\,$. The second factor $V^-\,$ is usually denoted by $iV_{\mathbb{R}}\,$. The direct sum $V=V^{+}\oplus V^{-}\,$ reads now as:

$$V=V_{\mathbb{R}} \oplus iV_{\mathbb{R}}\,$$,

i.e. as the direct sum of the "real" $V_{\mathbb{R}}\,$ and "imaginary" $iV_{\mathbb{R}}\,$ parts of V. This construction strongly depends on the choice of an antilinear involution of the complex vector space V. The complexification of the real vector space $V_{\mathbb{R}}\,$, i.e., $V^{\mathbb{C}}= V_{\mathbb R} \otimes_{\mathbb{R}} \mathbb{C}\,$ admits a natural real structure and hence is canonically isomorphic to the direct sum of two copies of $V_{\mathbb R}\,$:

$$V_{\mathbb R} \otimes_{\mathbb{R}} \mathbb{C}= V_{\mathbb{R}} \oplus iV_{\mathbb{R}}\,$$.

It follows a natural linear isomorphism $V_{\mathbb R} \otimes_{\mathbb{R}} \mathbb{C} \to V\,$ between complex vector spaces with a given real structure.

A real structure on a complex vector space V, that is an antilinear involution $\sigma: V \to V\,$, may be equivalently described in terms of the linear map $\hat \sigma:V\to\bar V\,$ from the vector space $V\,$ to the complex conjugate vector space $\bar V\,$ defined by

$v \mapsto \hat\sigma (v):=\overline{\sigma(v)}\,$.

== Algebraic variety ==
For an algebraic variety defined over a subfield of the real numbers, the real structure is the complex conjugation acting on the points of the variety in complex projective or affine space. Its fixed locus is the space of real points of the variety (which may be empty).

== Scheme ==
For a scheme defined over a subfield of the real numbers, complex conjugation is in a natural way a member of the Galois group of the algebraic closure of the base field. The real structure is the Galois action of this conjugation on the extension of the scheme over the algebraic closure of the base field. The real points are the points whose residue field is fixed (which may be empty).

== Reality structure ==
In mathematics, a reality structure on a complex vector space V is a decomposition of V into two real subspaces, called the real and imaginary parts of V:

$$V = V_\mathbb{R} \oplus i V_\mathbb{R}.$$

Here V_{R} is a real subspace of V, i.e. a subspace of V considered as a vector space over the real numbers. If V has complex dimension n (real dimension 2n), then V_{R} must have real dimension n.

The standard reality structure on the vector space $\mathbb{C}^n$ is the decomposition

$$\mathbb{C}^n = \mathbb{R}^n \oplus i\,\mathbb{R}^n.$$

In the presence of a reality structure, every vector in V has a real part and an imaginary part, each of which is a vector in V_{R}:

$$v = \operatorname{Re}\{v\}+i\,\operatorname{Im}\{v\}$$

In this case, the complex conjugate of a vector v is defined as follows:

$$\overline v = \operatorname{Re}\{v\} - i\,\operatorname{Im}\{v\}$$

This map $v \mapsto \overline v$ is an antilinear involution, i.e.

$$\overline{\overline v} = v,\quad \overline{v + w} = \overline{v} + \overline{w},\quad\text{and}\quad
\overline{\alpha v} = \overline\alpha \, \overline{v}.$$

Conversely, given an antilinear involution $v \mapsto c(v)$ on a complex vector space V, it is possible to define a reality structure on V as follows. Let

$$\operatorname{Re}\{v\}=\frac{1}{2}\left(v + c(v)\right),$$

and define

$$V_\mathbb{R} = \left\{\operatorname{Re}\{v\} \mid v \in V \right\}.$$

Then

$$V = V_\mathbb{R} \oplus i V_\mathbb{R}.$$

This is actually the decomposition of V as the eigenspaces of the real linear operator c. The eigenvalues of c are +1 and −1, with eigenspaces V_{R} and $i$ V_{R}, respectively. Typically, the operator c itself, rather than the eigenspace decomposition it entails, is referred to as the reality structure on V.

== See also ==
- Antilinear map
- Complex conjugate
- Complex conjugate vector space
- Complexification
- Linear complex structure
- Linear map
- Sesquilinear form
