= Dual representation =

Group representation

In mathematics, if G is a group and ρ is a linear representation of it on the vector space V, then the dual representation ρ* is defined over the dual vector space V* as follows:

ρ*(g) is the transpose of ρ(g^{−1}), that is, ρ*(g) = ρ(g^{−1})^{T} for all g ∈ G.

The dual representation is also known as the contragredient representation.

If g is a Lie algebra and π is a representation of it on the vector space V, then the dual representation π* is defined over the dual vector space V* as follows:

π*(X) = −π(X)^{T} for all X ∈ g.

The motivation for this definition is that Lie algebra representation associated to the dual of a Lie group representation is computed by the above formula. But the definition of the dual of a Lie algebra representation makes sense even if it does not come from a Lie group representation.

In both cases, the dual representation is a representation in the usual sense.

== Properties ==
=== Irreducibility and second dual ===
If a (finite-dimensional) representation is irreducible, then the dual representation is also irreducible—but not necessarily isomorphic to the original representation. On the other hand, the dual of the dual of any representation is isomorphic to the original representation.

=== Unitary representations ===
Consider a unitary representation $\rho$ of a group $G$, and let us work in an orthonormal basis. Thus, $\rho$ maps $G$ into the group of unitary matrices. Then the abstract transpose in the definition of the dual representation may be identified with the ordinary matrix transpose. Since the adjoint of a matrix is the complex conjugate of the transpose, the transpose is the conjugate of the adjoint. Thus, $\rho^\ast(g)$ is the complex conjugate of the adjoint of the inverse of $\rho(g)$. But since $\rho(g)$ is assumed to be unitary, the adjoint of the inverse of $\rho(g)$ is just $\rho(g)$.

The upshot of this discussion is that when working with unitary representations in an orthonormal basis, $\rho^*(g)$ is just the complex conjugate of $\rho(g)$.

=== The SU(2) and SU(3) cases ===
In the representation theory of SU(2), the dual of each irreducible representation does turn out to be isomorphic to the representation. But for the representations of SU(3), the dual of the irreducible representation with label $(m_1,m_2)$ is the irreducible representation with label $(m_2,m_1)$. In particular, the standard three-dimensional representation of SU(3) (with highest weight $(1,0)$) is not isomorphic to its dual. In the theory of quarks in the physics literature, the standard representation and its dual are called "$3$" and "$\bar 3$."

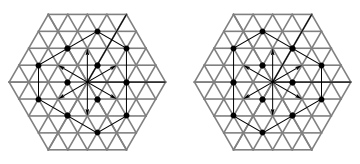
Two nonisomorphic dual representations of SU(3), with highest weights (1,2) and (2,1)

=== General semisimple Lie algebras ===
More generally, in the representation theory of semisimple Lie algebras (or the closely related representation theory of compact Lie groups), the weights of the dual representation are the negatives of the weights of the original representation. (See the figure.) Now, for a given Lie algebra, if it should happen that operator $-I$ is an element of the Weyl group, then the weights of every representation are automatically invariant under the map $\mu\mapsto -\mu$. For such Lie algebras, every irreducible representation will be isomorphic to its dual. (This is the situation for SU(2), where the Weyl group is $\{I,-I\}$.) Lie algebras with this property include the odd orthogonal Lie algebras $\operatorname{so}(2n+1;\mathbb C)$ (type $B_n$) and the symplectic Lie algebras $\operatorname{sp}(n;\mathbb C)$ (type $C_n$).

If, for a given Lie algebra, $-I$ is not in the Weyl group, then the dual of an irreducible representation will generically not be isomorphic to the original representation. To understand how this works, we note that there is always a unique Weyl group element $w_0$ mapping the negative of the fundamental Weyl chamber to the fundamental Weyl chamber. Then if we have an irreducible representation with highest weight $\mu$, the lowest weight of the dual representation will be $-\mu$. It then follows that the highest weight of the dual representation will be $w_0\cdot(-\mu)\,$. Since we are assuming $-I$ is not in the Weyl group, $w_0$ cannot be $-I$, which means that the map $\mu\mapsto w_0\cdot(-\mu)$ is not the identity. Of course, it may still happen that for certain special choices of $\mu$, we might have $\mu=w_0\cdot(-\mu)$. The adjoint representation, for example, is always isomorphic to its dual.

In the case of SU(3) (or its complexified Lie algebra, $\operatorname{sl}(3;\mathbb C)$), we may choose a base consisting of two roots $\{\alpha_1,\alpha_2\}$ at an angle of 120 degrees, so that the third positive root is $\alpha_3=\alpha_1+\alpha_2$. In this case, the element $w_0$ is the reflection about the line perpendicular to $\alpha_3$. Then the map $\mu\mapsto w_0\cdot(-\mu)$ is the reflection about the line through $\alpha_3$. The self-dual representations are then the ones that lie along the line through $\alpha_3$. These are the representations with labels of the form $(m,m)$, which are the representations whose weight diagrams are regular hexagons.

== Motivation ==
In representation theory, both vectors in V and linear functionals in V* are considered as column vectors so that the representation can act (by matrix multiplication) from the left. Given a basis for V and the dual basis for V*, the action of a linear functional φ on v, φ(v) can be expressed by matrix multiplication,

$$\langle\varphi, v\rangle \equiv \varphi(v) = \varphi^Tv$$,

where the superscript T is matrix transpose. Consistency requires

$\langle{\rho}^*(g)\varphi, \rho(g)v\rangle = \langle\varphi, v\rangle.$

With the definition given,

$$\langle{\rho}^*(g)\varphi, \rho(g)v\rangle = \langle\rho(g^{-1})^T\varphi, \rho(g)v\rangle = (\rho(g^{-1})^T\varphi)^T \rho(g)v = \varphi^T\rho(g^{-1})\rho(g)v = \varphi^Tv = \langle\varphi, v\rangle.$$

For the Lie algebra representation one chooses consistency with a possible group representation. Generally, if Π is a representation of a Lie group, then π given by

$$\pi(X) = \frac{d}{dt}\Pi(e^{tX})|_{t = 0}.$$

is a representation of its Lie algebra. If Π* is dual to Π, then its corresponding Lie algebra representation π* is given by

$\pi^*(X) = \frac{d}{dt}\Pi^*(e^{tX})|_{t = 0} = \frac{d}{dt}\Pi(e^{-tX})^T|_{t = 0} = -\pi(X)^T.$

== Example ==
Consider the group $G=U(1)$ of complex numbers of absolute value 1. The irreducible representations are all one dimensional, as a consequence of Schur's lemma. The irreducible representations are parameterized by integers $n$ and given explicitly as

$$\rho_n(e^{i\theta})=[e^{in\theta}].$$

The dual representation to $\rho_n$ is then the inverse of the transpose of this one-by-one matrix, that is,

$$\rho_n^*(e^{i\theta})=[e^{-in\theta}]=\rho_{-n}(e^{i\theta}).$$

That is to say, the dual of the representation $\rho_n$ is $\rho_{-n}$.

== Generalization ==
A general ring module does not admit a dual representation. Modules of Hopf algebras do, however.

== See also ==
- Complex conjugate representation
- Tensor product of representations
- Kirillov Character Formula
