= List object =

In category theory, an abstract branch of mathematics, and in its applications to logic and theoretical computer science, a list object is an abstract definition of a list, that is, a finite ordered sequence.

== Formal definition ==
Let C be a category with finite products and a terminal object 1. A list object over an object A of C is:

1. an object L_{A},
2. a morphism o_{A} : 1 → L_{A}, and
3. a morphism s_{A} : A × L_{A} → L_{A}

such that for any object B of C with maps b : 1 → B and t : A × B → B, there exists a unique f : L_{A} → B such that the following diagram commutes:

where〈id_{A}, f〉denotes the arrow induced by the universal property of the product when applied to id_{A} (the identity on A) and f. The notation A* (à la Kleene star) is sometimes used to denote lists over A.

=== Equivalent definitions ===
In a category with a terminal object 1, binary coproducts (denoted by +), and binary products (denoted by ×), a list object over A can be defined as the initial algebra of the endofunctor that acts on objects by X ↦ 1 + (A × X) and on arrows by f ↦ [id_{1},〈id_{A}, f〉].

== Examples ==
- In Set, the category of sets, list objects over a set A are simply finite lists with elements drawn from A. In this case, o_{A} picks out the empty list and s_{A} corresponds to appending an element to the head of the list.
- In the calculus of inductive constructions or similar type theories with inductive types (or heuristically, even strongly typed functional languages such as Haskell), lists are types defined by two constructors, nil and cons, which correspond to o_{A} and s_{A}, respectively. The recursion principle for lists guarantees they have the expected universal property.

== Properties ==
Like all constructions defined by a universal property, lists over an object are unique up to canonical isomorphism.

The object L_{1} (lists over the terminal object) has the universal property of a natural number object. In any category with lists, one can define the length of a list L_{A} to be the unique morphism l : L_{A} → L_{1} which makes the following diagram commute:

== See also ==
- Natural number object
- F-algebra
- Initial algebra
