= Hylomorphism (computer science) =

Recursive function

In computer science, and in particular functional programming, a hylomorphism is a recursive function, corresponding to the composition of an anamorphism (which first builds a set of results; also known as 'unfolding') followed by a catamorphism (which then folds these results into a final return value). Fusion of these two recursive computations into a single recursive pattern then avoids building the intermediate data structure. This is an example of deforestation, a program optimization strategy. A related type of function is a metamorphism, which is a catamorphism followed by an anamorphism.

== Formal definition ==
A hylomorphism $h : A \rightarrow C$ can be defined in terms of its separate anamorphic and catamorphic parts.

The anamorphic part can be defined in terms of a unary function $g : A \rightarrow B \times A$ defining the list of elements in $B$ by repeated application ("unfolding"), and a predicate $p : A \rightarrow \text{Boolean}$ providing the terminating condition.

The catamorphic part can be defined as a combination of an initial value $c \in C$ for the fold and a binary operator $\oplus : B \times C \rightarrow C$ used to perform the fold.

Thus a hylomorphism

$$h\,a = \begin{cases}
c & \mbox{if } p\,a
\\b \oplus h\,a' \,\,\,\mbox{where} \,(b, a') = g\,a & \mbox{otherwise}
\end{cases}$$

may be defined (assuming appropriate definitions of $p$ & $g$).

=== Notation ===
An abbreviated notation for the above hylomorphism is $h = [\![(c, \oplus),(g, p)]\!]$.

== Hylomorphisms in practice ==
=== Lists ===
Lists are common data structures as they naturally reflect linear computational processes. These processes arise in repeated (iterative) function calls. Therefore, it is sometimes necessary to generate a temporary list of intermediate results before reducing this list to a single result.

One example of a commonly encountered hylomorphism is the canonical factorial function.

factorial :: Integer -> Integer
factorial n
  | n == 0 = 1
  | n > 0 = n * factorial (n - 1)

In the previous example (written in Haskell, a purely functional programming language) it can be seen that this function, applied to any given valid input, will generate a linear call tree isomorphic to a list. For example, given n = 5 it will produce the following:

factorial 5 = 5 * (factorial 4) = 120
factorial 4 = 4 * (factorial 3) = 24
factorial 3 = 3 * (factorial 2) = 6
factorial 2 = 2 * (factorial 1) = 2
factorial 1 = 1 * (factorial 0) = 1
factorial 0 = 1

In this example, the anamorphic part of the process is the generation of the call tree which is isomorphic to the list [1, 1, 2, 3, 4, 5]. The catamorphism, then, is the calculation of the product of the elements of this list. Thus, in the notation given above, the factorial function may be written as $\text{factorial} = [\![(1,\times),(g, p)]\!]$ where $g\ n = (n, n - 1)$ and $p\ n = (n = 0)$.

=== Trees ===
However, the term 'hylomorphism' does not apply solely to functions acting upon isomorphisms of lists. For example, a hylomorphism may also be defined by generating a non-linear call tree which is then collapsed. An example of such a function is the function to generate the n^{th} term of the Fibonacci sequence.

 fibonacci :: Integer -> Integer
 fibonacci n
   | n == 0 = 0
   | n == 1 = 1
   | n > 1 = fibonacci (n - 2) + fibonacci (n - 1)

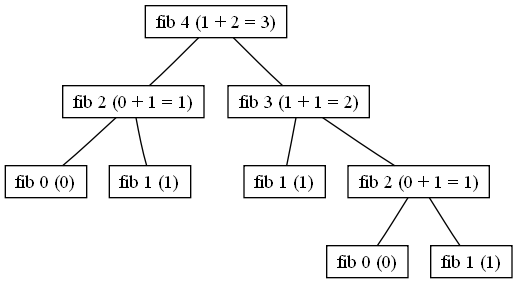
Call tree for fibonacci 4

This function, again applied to any valid input, will generate a call tree which is non-linear. In the example on the right, the call tree generated by applying the fibonacci function to the input 4.

This time, the anamorphism is the generation of the call tree isomorphic to the tree with leaf nodes 0, 1, 1, 0, 1 and the catamorphism the summation of these leaf nodes.

== See also ==
- Morphism
- Morphisms of F-algebras
  - From an initial algebra to an algebra: Catamorphism
  - From a coalgebra to a final coalgebra: Anamorphism
  - Extension of the idea of catamorphisms: Paramorphism
  - Extension of the idea of anamorphisms: Apomorphism
