= Cordell Green =

American computer scientist

- Born: Claude Cordell Green; December 26, 1941
- Died: February 12, 2025 (aged 83)
- Education: Rice University; Stanford University
- Awards: Grace Murray Hopper Award (1985)
- Scientific career
- Fields: Computer science
- Workplaces: Stanford University; Kestrel Institute
- Thesis: The Application of Theorem Proving to Question-Answering Systems (1969)
- Doctoral advisor: John McCarthy

Cordell Green (December 26, 1941 – February 12, 2025) was an American computer scientist who was the director and chief scientist of the Kestrel Institute.

Green received a B.A. and B.S. from Rice University. At Stanford University, he earned an M.S. and then a PhD in 1969.

Green worked at the DARPA Information Processing Techniques Office, where he helped to plan the Speech Understanding Research Project and also served as an assistant to Lawrence Roberts, who was then creating ARPANET. At Stanford, Green was a lecturer and assistant professor of computer science and was part of the Artificial Intelligence Group at the Stanford Research Institute (now known as SRI International). Later, he worked at Systems Control, Inc., a research firm in California, as their chief scientist for computer systems.

In 1985, Green was awarded the Grace Murray Hopper Award for establishing the theoretical basis of the field of logic programming. In 2002, he was awarded the Stevens Award for "contributions to methods for software and systems development". He was a fellow of the ACM, AAAI, and ASE.
