= Lambert Meertens =

Dutch computer scientist and professor

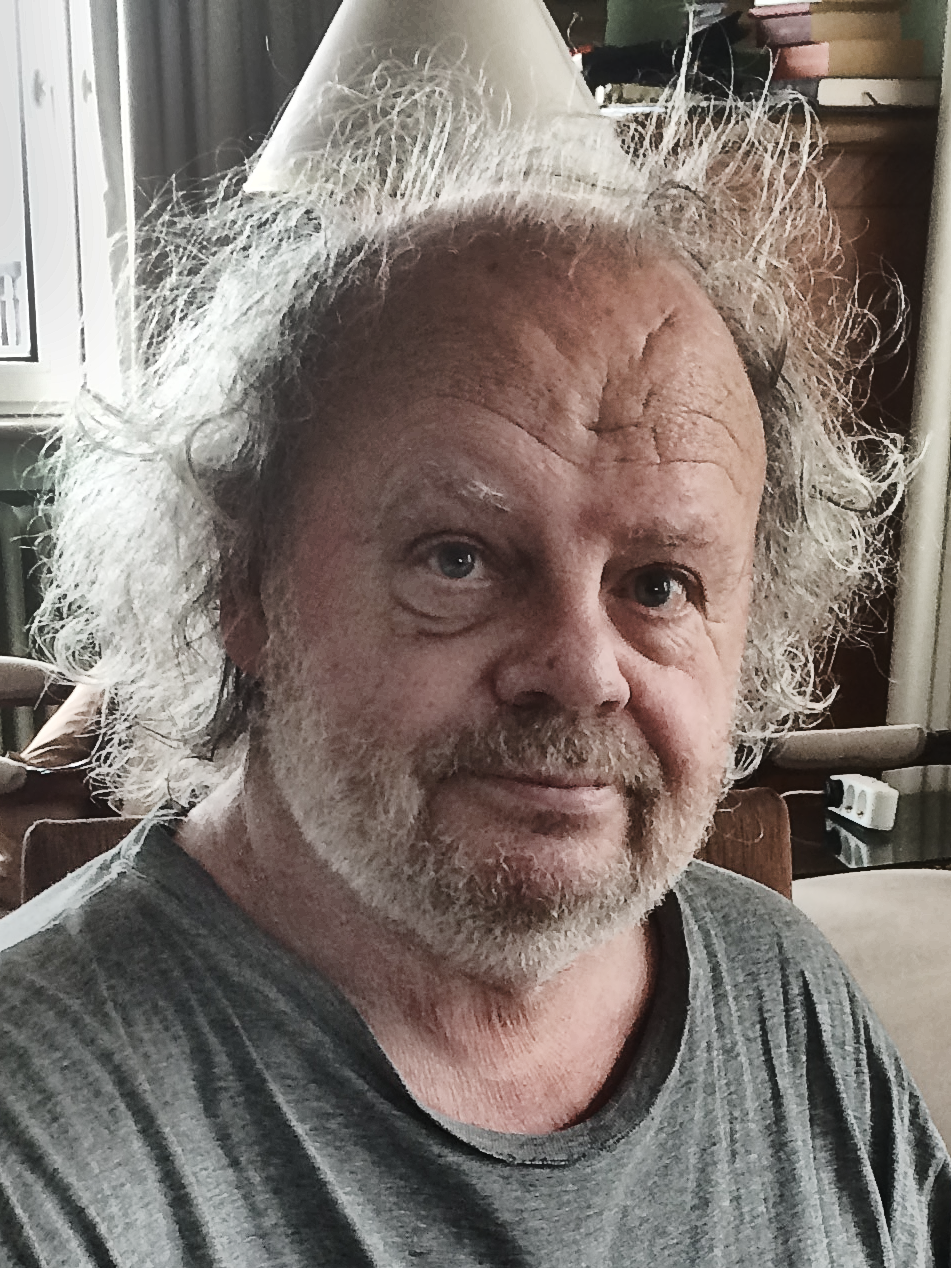
- Born: Lambert Guillaume Louis Théodore Meertens; 10 May 1944 (age 82); Amsterdam, Netherlands
- Citizenship: Netherlands
- Known for: ALGOL 68, ABC, Bird–Meertens formalism
- Awards: IFIP Silver Core (2007); IFIP Outstanding Service Award (2015)
- Scientific career
- Fields: Computer science
- Institutions: Centrum Wiskunde & Informatica; Utrecht University; Kestrel Institute

Lambert Guillaume Louis Théodore Meertens (born 10 May 1944) is a Dutch computer scientist who is professor emeritus at Utrecht University. As of 2020, he is a researcher at the Kestrel Institute.

== Life and career ==
Meertens was born in Amsterdam. As a student at the Ignatius Gymnasium in Amsterdam, he designed a computer with Kees Koster, a classmate. In the 1960s, Meertens applied affix grammars to the description and composition of music, and obtained a special prize from the jury at the 1968 International Federation for Information Processing (IFIP) Congress in Edinburgh for his computer-generated string quartet, Quartet No. 1 in C major for 2 violins, viola and violoncello, based on the first non-context-free affix grammar. The string quartet was published in 1968, as Mathematical Centre Report MR 96.

Meertens was one of the editors of the Revised ALGOL 68 Report. He was the originator and one of the designers of the programming language ABC, the incidental predecessor of Python. He was codesigner of the Bird–Meertens formalism, along with Richard Bird, who also gifted him the Meertens number.

He became involved with developing international standards in programming and informatics, as a member of IFIP Working Group 2.1 on Algorithmic Languages and Calculi, which specified, maintains, and supports the languages ALGOL 60 and ALGOL 68. From 1999 to 2009, he was chairperson.

His original work was at the Mathematical Centre (MC), now called Centrum Wiskunde & Informatica (CWI), in Amsterdam, the Netherlands. He co-founded the Pagelet project along with Susan Uskudarli and T. B. Dinesh.

After having been associate professor of Computer Science at New York University in 1982–83, he was part-time Professor of Applied Logic at Delft University of Technology, the Netherlands, from 1984 to 1986 before becoming part-time Professor of Software Technology at Utrecht University, the Netherlands, where he is now professor emeritus. As of 2021, he works as a researcher at the Kestrel Institute in Palo Alto, California.

== Political activity ==
Meertens was chairman of the Dutch Pacifist Socialist Party (PSP) from 1975 until 1981. He remains on the political left, reflecting on an ideology that could unite left-wing activists.

== Awards ==
- 2007: International Federation for Information Processing (IFIP) Silver Core
- 2015: IFIP Outstanding Service Award
