= T. B. Dinesh =

Indian mathematician and computer scientist

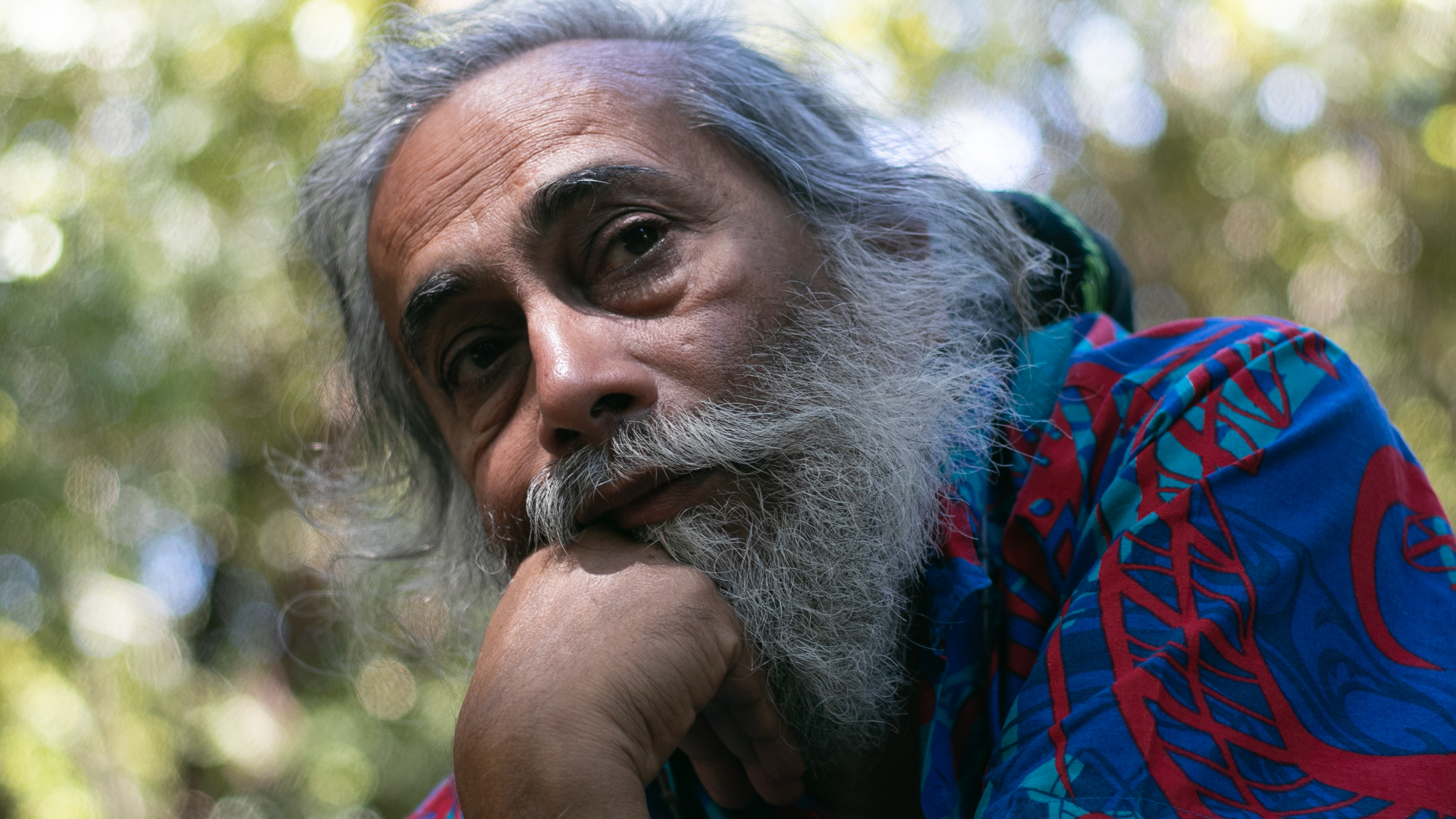
- Education: University of Iowa
- Website: open.janastu.org/people/tb-dinesh

T. B. Dinesh is an Indian computer scientist and mathematician. He started his research with generating software based on algebraic specification and later focused on web 2.0, web accessibility, web annotation, hypermedia and mesh networking. In 1999, he co-founded the Pagelets project. In 2002, he founded [Janastu.org Janastu] in Bangalore, a non-profit where he serves as technical director, and a company called Servelots. Both serve non-profits with free and open-source software and developing ways for re-narration of the web with web accessibility for the print-impaired. He has studied and built community-based digital tools such as SWeeT Web, Alipi, Pantoto, CoLRN and Papad.

== Life and career ==
T. B. Dinesh introduces himself and his work

Dinesh was born in Tumkur. He studied electronics and communication engineering. Dinesh studied mathematics and computer science at University of Iowa for his postgraduate program. He finished his Doctor of Philosophy in computer science in 1992, researching on generating software based on algebraic expression. He later continued his post-doctoral research at Centrum voor Wiskunde en Informatica where he had earlier worked for a doctoral project. He then worked at the Stanford Research Institute, where he co-founded the Pagelets project in 1999 along with Susan Uskudarli and Lambert Meertens. He moved to Bangalore in 2002 and built a participatory information resource creation and management system called Pantoto and founded Janastu in 2002.
