= Dialgebra =

In abstract algebra, a dialgebra is the generalization of both algebra and coalgebra. The notion was originally introduced by Lambek as "subequalizers", and named as dialgebras by Tatsuya Hagino. Many algebraic notions have previously been generalized to dialgebras. Dialgebra also attempts to obtain Lie algebras from associated algebras.

== See also ==
- F-algebra
