= Kestrel Institute =

Computer science research center

- Type: Think tank
- Registration no.: 94-2750021
- Legal status: Nonprofit
- Purpose: R&D on methods for software assurance
- Location: Palo Alto, California
- Fields: Computer science
- Director: Cordell Green
- Revenue: $4.9 million (2015)
- Website: kestrel.edu

The Kestrel Institute is a nonprofit computer science research center located in Stanford Research Park in Palo Alto, California, United States. It was founded by Cordell Green in 1981, who served as its Director and Chief Scientist. Its mission is to make it easier to write good, high-quality software and employs computer scientists like Lambert Meertens.

In the 1980s, Kestrel described its research focus as "knowledge-based software environments" to make it easier to write software ("normalize and mechanize the programming process"). In addition, a 2002 MIT Technology Review article described one of Kestrel's projects as a way to "almost force coders to write reliable programs". A 2005 Newsweek article discussed one Kestrel technology that developed software to help the U.S. military schedule cargo deployment by "translating a description of a problem into guidelines a computer can understand".

Nearly all of Kestrel's funding comes from government grants, from organizations such as the U.S. Department of Defense, DARPA, Intelligence Advanced Research Projects Activity (IARPA), Air Force Research Laboratory (AFRL), AFOSR, Office of Naval Research (ONR), NASA, and the National Science Foundation (NSF). In 2015, it received $4.9 million in grants and contributions, down from the previous year's $6.6 million.
