= Jeremy Gibbons =

British computer scientist

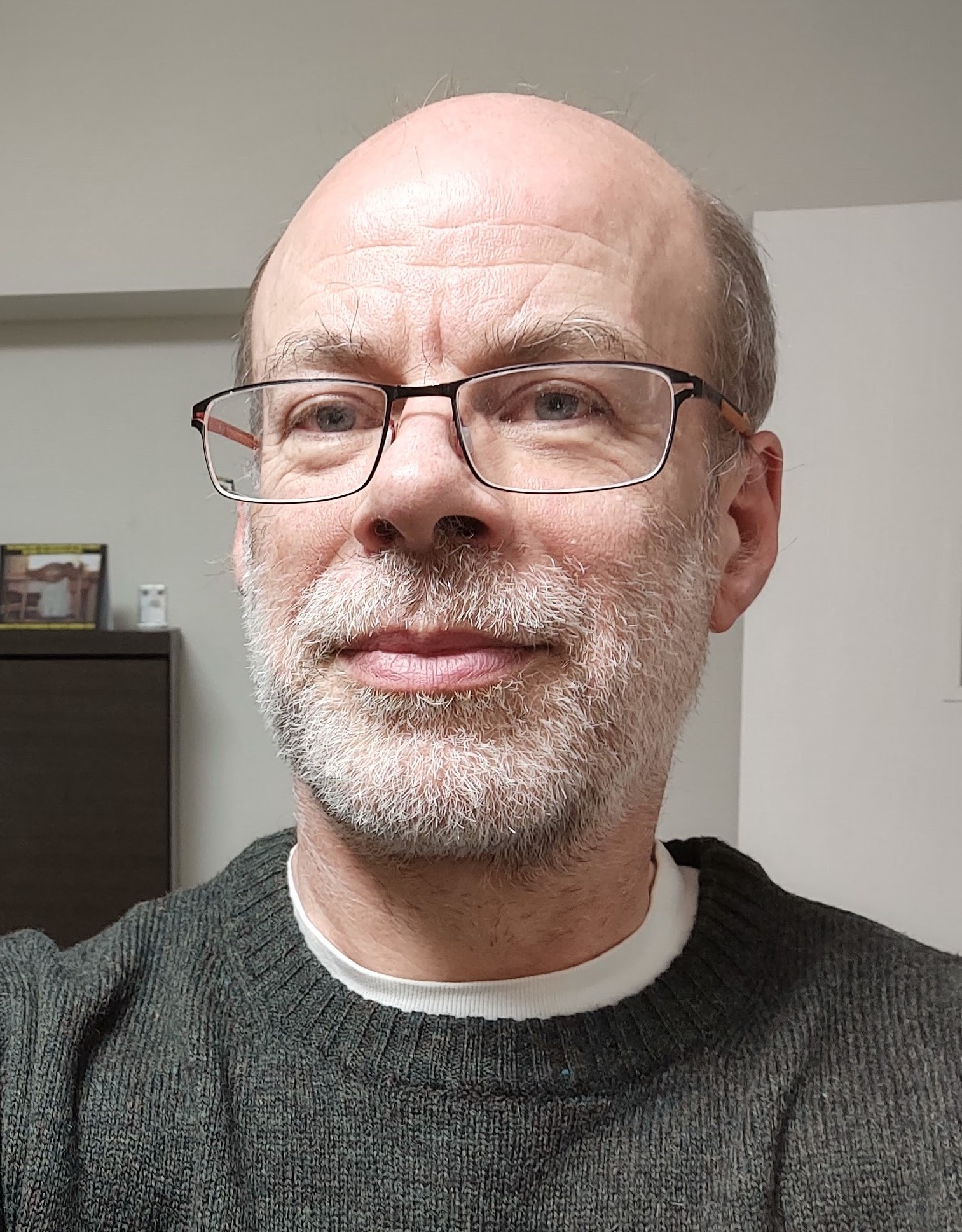
- Gibbons in 2023
- Citizenship: United Kingdom; New Zealand
- Education: University of Edinburgh (B.Sc., 1987); University of Oxford (D.Phil., 1991)
- Scientific career
- Fields: Computer science
- Institutions: University of Auckland; Oxford Brookes University; University of Oxford
- Thesis: Algebras for tree algorithms (1991)
- Website: www.comlab.ox.ac.uk/jeremy.gibbons

Jeremy Gibbons is a computer scientist and professor of computing at the University of Oxford. He serves as Deputy Director of the Software Engineering Programme in the Department of Computer Science, Governing Body Fellow at Kellogg College and Pro-Proctor of the University of Oxford.

== Academic ==
Professor Gibbons obtained a Bachelor of Science (BSc) (Hons) in computer science from the University of Edinburgh (1983–1987), and a Doctor of Philosophy (DPhil) in Computation from the University of Oxford (1987–1991).

Before taking his current post, he was, first, lecturer in computer science, University of Auckland (1991–1996), next, lecturer and senior lecturer in computing, Oxford Brookes University (1996–1999), and then reader in software engineering at the University of Oxford.

His research activities include programming languages and methods; functional programming; generic programming; object technology; program specification, derivation and transformation.

His current projects include CancerGrid; Datatype-Generic Programming; Automatic Generation of Software Components; Workflow for Cancer Bioinformatics.

His publications cover generic programming, functional programming, formal methods, computational biology, bioinformatics, and Algorithm Design with Haskell co-authored with Richard Bird.

He is a member of the International Federation for Information Processing (IFIP) IFIP Working Group 2.1 on Algorithmic Languages and Calculi, which specified, maintains, and supports the programming languages ALGOL 60 and ALGOL 68. Since 2009, he has been chairperson.
