= Richard Bird (computer scientist) =

English computer scientist (1943–2022)

Richard Simpson Bird
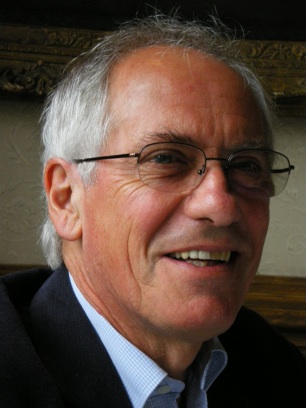
- Born: 13 February 1943; London, England
- Died: 4 April 2022 (aged 79)
- Education: University of Cambridge; Imperial College London
- Known for: Algorithm design Functional programming Bird–Meertens formalism
- Scientific career
- Fields: Computer science Formal methods
- Institutions: University of Reading; University of Oxford
- Thesis: Computational complexity on register machines (1974)
- Doctoral advisor: Michael Bell
- Doctoral students: Jeremy Gibbons
- Website: www.cs.ox.ac.uk/people/richard.bird

Richard Simpson Bird (13 February 1943 – 4 April 2022) was an English computer scientist.

== Education and career ==
Richard Bird was born in London and educated at St Olave's Grammar School in Southwark, south London. He studied mathematics at the University of Cambridge. He worked briefly at International Computers and Tabulators and then started postgraduate study at the University of London Institute of Computer Science. He joined the University of Reading as a lecturer in 1972 and received his PhD degree from Imperial College London in 1974. In 1983, he was appointed as a Supernumerary Fellow of Computation at Lincoln College, one of the colleges at the University of Oxford. He was a member of the Programming Research Group under the leadership of Tony Hoare at Oxford, and eventually became the director of the Oxford University Computing Laboratory (now the Department of Computer Science, University of Oxford) from 1998 to 2003.

Bird succeeded Tony Hoare as the series editor of the Prentice Hall International Series in Computer Science. He also established and was the founding editor of the "Functional Pearls" column, from the first issue of the Journal of Functional Programming in 1991 until his retirement in 2008.

== Research interests ==
Bird's research interests lay in algorithm design and functional programming, and he was known as a regular contributor to the Journal of Functional Programming, and as author of several books promoting use of the programming language Haskell, including Introduction to Functional Programming using Haskell, Thinking Functionally with Haskell, Algorithm Design with Haskell co-authored with Jeremy Gibbons, and other books on related topics. His name is associated with the Bird–Meertens formalism, a calculus for deriving programs from specifications in a functional programming style.

== Books ==
Bird published the following books, among others:

- Bird, Richard (1976). Programs and Machines: An Introduction to the Theory of Computation. Series in Computing. John Wiley and Sons. ISBN 978-0471016502.
- Bird, Richard; Wadler, Phil (1988). Introduction to Functional Programming. Series in Computer Science. Prentice Hall International. ISBN 978-0134841977.
- Bird, Richard; De Moor, Oege (1997). The Algebra of Programming. Series in Computer Science. Prentice Hall International. ISBN 978-0135072455.
- Bird, Richard (1998). Introduction to Functional Programming using Haskell. Series in Computer Science (2nd ed.). Prentice Hall. ISBN 978-0134843469.
- Bird, Richard (2010). Pearls of Functional Algorithm Design. Cambridge University Press. ISBN 978-0521513388.
- Bird, Richard; Gibbons, Jeremy (2020). Algorithm Design with Haskell. Cambridge University Press. ISBN 978-1108491617.

== Other organisational affiliations ==
He was a member of the International Federation for Information Processing (IFIP) IFIP Working Group 2.1 on Algorithmic Languages and Calculi, which specified, supports, and maintains the programming languages ALGOL 60 and ALGOL 68.

== Richard Bird Distinguished Dissertation Award ==
On 4 August 2026, the establishment of the Richard Bird Distinguished Dissertation Award was announced. The award is given for outstanding PhD dissertations in functional programming.
