= List of finite-dimensional Nichols algebras =

In mathematics, a Nichols algebra is a Hopf algebra in a braided category assigned to an object V in this category (e.g. a braided vector space). The Nichols algebra is a quotient of the tensor algebra of V enjoying a certain universal property and is typically infinite-dimensional. Nichols algebras appear naturally in any pointed Hopf algebra and enabled their classification in important cases. The most well known examples for Nichols algebras are the Borel parts $U_q(\mathfrak{g})^+$ of the infinite-dimensional quantum groups when q is no root of unity, and the first examples of finite-dimensional Nichols algebras are the Borel parts $u_q(\mathfrak{g})^+$ of the Frobenius–Lusztig kernel (small quantum group) when q is a root of unity.

The following article lists all known finite-dimensional Nichols algebras $\mathfrak{B}(V)$ where $V$ is a Yetter–Drinfel'd module over a finite group $G$, where the group is generated by the support of $V$. For more details on Nichols algebras see Nichols algebra.

- There are two major cases:
  - $G$ abelian, which implies $V$ is diagonally braided $x_i\otimes x_j\mapsto q_{ij}x_j\otimes x_i$.
  - $G$ nonabelian.
- The rank is the number of irreducible summands $V=\bigoplus_{i\in I} V_i$ in the semisimple Yetter–Drinfel'd module $V$.
- The irreducible summands $V_i=\mathcal{O}_{[g]}^\chi$ are each associated to a conjugacy class $[g]\subset G$ and an irreducible representation $\chi$ of the centralizer $\operatorname{Cent}(g)$.
- To any Nichols algebra there is by attached
  - a generalized root system and a Weyl groupoid. These are classified in.
  - In particular several Dynkin diagrams (for inequivalent types of Weyl chambers). Each Dynkin diagram has one vertex per irreducible $V_i$ and edges depending on their braided commutators in the Nichols algebra.
- The Hilbert series of the graded algebra $\mathfrak{B}(V)$ is given. An observation is that it factorizes in each case into polynomials $(n)_t:=1+t+t^2+\cdots + t^{n-1}$. We only give the Hilbert series and dimension of the Nichols algebra in characteristic $0$.

Note that a Nichols algebra only depends on the braided vector space $V$ and can therefore be realized over many different groups. Sometimes there are two or three Nichols algebras with different $V$ and non-isomorphic Nichols algebra, which are closely related (e.g. cocycle twists of each other). These are given by different conjugacy classes in the same column.

== State of classification ==
(as of 2015)

=== Established classification results ===
- Finite-dimensional diagonal Nichols algebras over the complex numbers were classified by Heckenberger in. The case of arbitrary characteristic is ongoing work of Heckenberger, Wang.
- Finite-dimensional Nichols algebras of semisimple Yetter–Drinfel'd modules of rank >1 over finite nonabelian groups (generated by the support) were classified by Heckenberger and Vendramin in.

=== Negative criteria ===
The case of rank 1 (irreducible Yetter–Drinfel'd module) over a nonabelian group is still largely open, with few examples known.

Much progress has been made by Andruskiewitsch and others by finding subracks (for example diagonal ones) that would lead to infinite-dimensional Nichols algebras. As of 2015, known groups not admitting finite-dimensional Nichols algebras are

- for alternating groups $\mathbb{A}_{n\geq 5}$
- for symmetric groups $\mathbb{S}_{n\geq 6}$ except a short list of examples
- some group of Lie type such as most $PSL_n(\mathbb{F}_q)$ and most unipotent classes in $Sp_{2n}(\mathbb{F}_q)$
- all sporadic groups except a short list of possibilities (resp. conjugacy classes in ATLAS notation) that are all real or j = 3-quasireal:
  - ...for the Fischer group $Fi_{22}\;$ the classes $22A,22B\;$
  - ...for the baby monster group B the classes $16C,\;16D,\;32A,\;32B,\;32C,\;32D,\;34A,\;46A,\;46B\;$
  - ...for the monster group M the classes $32A,\;32B,\;46A,\;46B,\;92A,\;92B,\;94A,\;94B\;$

Usually a large amount of conjugacy classes ae of type D ("not commutative enough"), while the others tend to possess sufficient abelian subracks and can be excluded by their consideration. Several cases have to be done by-hand. Note that the open cases tend to have very small centralizers (usually cyclic) and representations χ (usually the 1-dimensional sign representation). Significant exceptions are the conjugacy classes of order 16, 32 having as centralizers p-groups of order 2048 resp. 128 and currently no restrictions on χ.

== Over abelian groups ==
Finite-dimensional diagonal Nichols algebras over the complex numbers were classified by Heckenberger in in terms of the braiding matrix $q_{ij}$, more precisely the data $q_{ii},q_{ij}q_{ji}$. The small quantum groups $u_q(\mathfrak{g})^+$ are a special case $q_{ij}=q^{(\alpha_i,\alpha_j)}$, but there are several exceptional examples involving the primes 2,3,4,5,7.

Recently there has been progress understanding the other examples as exceptional Lie algebras and super-Lie algebras in finite characteristic.

== Over nonabelian group, rank > 1 ==
=== Nichols algebras from Coxeter groups ===
For every finite coxeter system $(W,S)$ the Nichols algebra over the conjugacy class(es) of reflections was studied in (reflections on roots of different length are not conjugate, see fourth example fellow). They discovered in this way the following first Nichols algebras over nonabelian groups :

Rank, Type of root system of $\mathfrak{B}(V)$	$A_1$	$A_1$	$A_1$	$A_2$
Dimension of $V$	$3$	$6$	$10$	$2+2$
Dimension of Nichols algebra(s)	$12$	$576\;=24^2$	$8294400$	$64$
Hilbert series	$(2)_t^2 (3)_t$	$(2)^2_t (3)^2_t (4)^2_t$	$(4)_t^4 (5)_t^2 (6)_t^4$	$(2)^4_{t} (2)^2_{t^2}$
Smallest realizing group	Symmetric group $\;\mathbb{S}_3$	Symmetric group $\;\mathbb{S}_4$	Symmetric group $\;\mathbb{S}_5$	Dihedral group $\;\mathbb{D}_4$
... and conjugacy classes	$\mathcal{O}_{(12)}^{-1}$	$\mathcal{O}_{(1234)}^{-1},\quad \mathcal{O}_{(12)}^{-1},\quad \mathcal{O}_{(12)}^{-1\otimes \sgn}$	$\mathcal{O}_{(12)}^{-1},\quad\mathcal{O}_{(12)}^{-1\otimes \sgn}$	$\mathcal{O}_{b}^\epsilon\oplus \mathcal{O}^\epsilon_{a^2b},\quad \mathcal{O}_{b}^{sgn}\oplus \mathcal{O}^{sgn}_{a^2b}$
Source				
Comments	Kirilov–Fomin algebras			This smallest nonabelian Nichols algebra of rank 2 is the case $\Gamma_2$ in the classification. It can be constructed as smallest example of an infinite series $A_n$ from $A_n\cup A_n$, see.

The case $\mathbb{S}_2\cong \mathbb{Z}_2$ is the rank 1 diagonal Nichols algebra $u_i(A_1)^+$ of dimension 2.

=== Other Nichols algebras of rank 1 ===
Rank, Type of root system of $\mathfrak{B}(V)$	$A_1$	$A_1$	$A_1$	$A_1$
Dimension of $V$	$4$	$4$	$5$	$7$
Dimension of Nichols algebra(s)	$72$	$5,184$	$1,280$	$326,592$
Hilbert series	$(2)^2_t (3)_t (6)_t$	$(6)^4_{t} (2)^2_{t^2}$	$(4)^4_{t} (5)_t$	$(6)^6_{t} (7)_t$
Smallest realizing group	Special linear group $SL_2(3)$ extending the alternating group $\mathbb{A}_4$		Affine linear group $\mathbb{Z}_5\rtimes\mathbb{Z}_5^\times$	Affine linear group $\mathbb{Z}_7\rtimes\mathbb{Z}_7^\times$
... and conjugacy classes	$$\mathcal{O}_{\begin{pmatrix} -1 & 1 \\ 0 & -1\end{pmatrix}}^{-1}$$	$$\mathcal{O}_{\begin{pmatrix} 1 & 1 \\ 0 & 1\end{pmatrix}}^{\zeta_6}$$	$\mathcal{O}_{i\rtimes 2}^{-1},\quad \mathcal{O}_{i\rtimes 3}^{-1}$	$\mathcal{O}_{i\rtimes 3}^{-1},\quad \mathcal{O}_{i\rtimes 5}^{-1}$
Source				
Comments	There exists a Nichols algebra of rank 2 containing this Nichols algebra	Only example with many cubic (but not many quadratic) relations.	Affine racks	

=== Nichols algebras of rank 2, type Gamma-3 ===
These Nichols algebras were discovered during the classification of Heckenberger and Vendramin.

			only in characteristic 2
Rank, Type of root system of $\mathfrak{B}(V)$	$B_2,B_2$	$B_2,B_2$	$$\begin{pmatrix}2 & -2 \\ -2 & 2 \end{pmatrix}$$ $$\begin{pmatrix}2 & -2 \\ -1 & 2 \end{pmatrix}$$ $$\begin{pmatrix}2 & -4 \\ -1 & 2 \end{pmatrix}$$
Dimension of $V$	$3+2$	$3+1$ resp. $3+2$	$3+1$ resp. $3+2$
Dimension of Nichols algebra(s)	$2,304$	$10,368$	$2,239,488$
Hilbert series	$(2)_t^2(3)_t\cdot (2)_{t}^2$	$(2)_t^2(3)_t\cdot(6)_{t}$$\cdot (2)_{t^2}^2(3)_{t^2}\cdot (2)_{t^3}(6)_{t^3}$	
Smallest realizing group and conjugacy class	$\mathbb{S}_3\times \mathbb{Z}_2$	$\mathbb{S}_3\times \mathbb{Z}_6$	
... and conjugacy classes	$\mathcal{O}_{(12)}^{-1,1}\oplus \mathcal{O}_{\{z\}}^{1,\sigma_2}$	$\mathcal{O}_{(12)}^{-1,\zeta_6}\oplus \mathcal{O}_{\{z\}}^{1,\zeta_6^{-1}}$	
Source			
Comments	Only example with a 2-dimensional irreducible representation $\sigma$	There exists a Nichols algebra of rank 3 extending this Nichols algebra	Only in characteristic 2. Has a non-Lie type root system with 6 roots.

=== The Nichols algebra of rank 2 type Gamma-4 ===
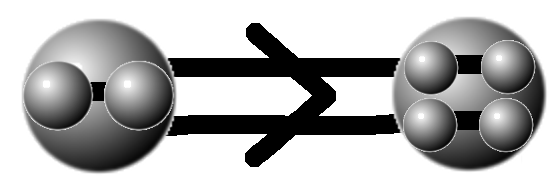
This Nichols algebra was discovered during the classification of Heckenberger and Vendramin.

Root system	$B_2$
Dimension of $V$	$2+4$
Dimension of Nichols algebra	$262,144 \;= 2^{18}$
Hilbert series	$(2)_t^2(2)_{t^2} \cdot (2)_{t}^4(2)_{t^2}^2 \cdot (2)_{t^2}^4(2^2)_{t^4}^2 \cdot (2)_{t^3}^2(2)_{t^6}$
Smallest realizing group	$\tilde{\mathbb{D}}_8$ (semidihedral group)
...and conjugacy class	$\mathcal{O}_{[h]}^{-1}\oplus \mathcal{O}_{[g]}^{\zeta_8}$
Comments	Both rank 1 Nichols algebra contained in this Nichols algebra decompose over their respective support: The left node to a Nichols algebra over the Coxeter group $\mathbb{D}_4$, the right node to a diagonal Nichols algebra of type $A_2$.

=== The Nichols algebra of rank 2, type T ===
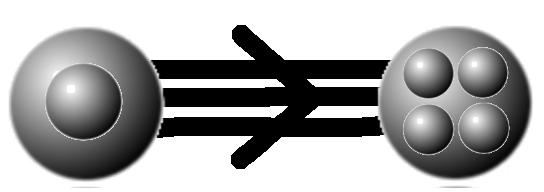
This Nichols algebra was discovered during the classification of Heckenberger and Vendramin.

Root system	$G_2$
Dimension of $V$	$1+4$
Dimension of Nichols algebra	$80,621,568$
Hilbert series	$(6)_t\cdot (2)_t^2(3)_t(6)_t\cdot (2)_{t^2}^2(3)_{t^2}(6)_{t^2} \cdot (2)_{t^3}^2(3)_{t^3}(6)_{t^3}\cdot (6)_{t^4}\cdot (6)_{t^5}$
Smallest realizing group	$\Z_6\times SL_2(3)$
...and conjugacy class	$$\mathcal{O}_{\{z\}}^{\zeta_6,\zeta_6^{-1}} \oplus\mathcal{O}_{\begin{pmatrix}-1 & 1 \\ 0 & -1\end{pmatrix}}^{1,-1}$$
Comments	The rank 1 Nichols algebra contained in this Nichols algebra is irreducible over its support $SL_2(3)$ and can be found above.

=== The Nichols algebra of rank 3 involving Gamma-3 ===
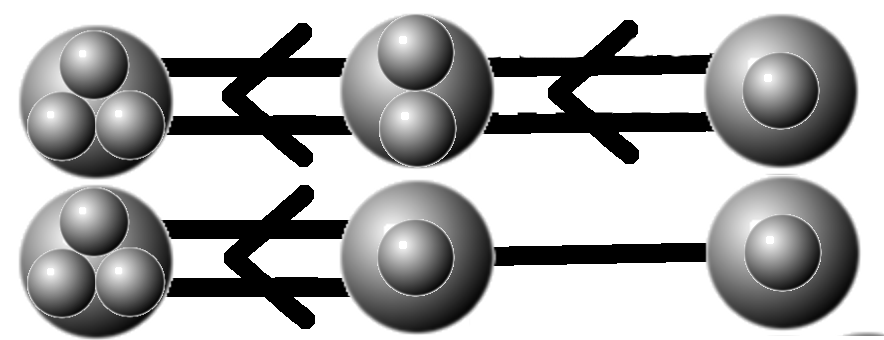
This Nichols algebra was the last Nichols algebra discovered during the classification of Heckenberger and Vendramin.

Root system	Rank 3 Number 9 with 13 roots
Dimension of $V$	$3+2+1$ resp. $3+1+1$
Dimension of Nichols algebra	$1,671,768,834,048$
Hilbert series	$(2)_t^2(3)_t\cdot (6)_{t}\cdot (6)_t \cdot (2)_{t^2}^2(3)_{t^2}\cdot (6)_{t^2} \cdot (2)_{t^3}(6)_{t^3}\cdot (2)_{t^3}^2(3)_{t^3}$$\cdot (2)_{t^4}(6)_{t^4} \cdot (2)_{t^5}(6)_{t^5} \cdot (2)_{t^6}^2(3)_{t^6}\cdot (6)_{t^7} \cdot (6)_{t^8} \cdot (6)_{t^9}$
Smallest realizing group	$\mathbb{S}_3\times \mathbb{Z}_6\times \mathbb{Z}_6$
...and conjugacy class	$\mathcal{O} _{(12)}^{-1,\zeta_6,1}\oplus \mathcal{O} _{\{z\}}^{1,\zeta_6^{-1},1} \oplus \mathcal{O} _{\{w\}}^{1,\zeta_6,\zeta_6^{-1}}$
Comments	The rank 2 Nichols algebra cenerated by the two leftmost node is of type $\Gamma_3$ and can be found above. The rank 2 Nichols algebra generated by the two rightmost nodes is either diagonal of type $A_2$ or $A_3$.

=== Nichols algebras from diagram folding ===
The following families Nichols algebras were constructed by Lentner using diagram folding, the fourth example appearing only in characteristic 3 was discovered during the classification of Heckenberger and Vendramin.

The construction start with a known Nichols algebra (here diagonal ones related to quantum groups) and an additional automorphism of the Dynkin diagram. Hence the two major cases are whether this automorphism exchanges two disconnected copies or is a proper diagram automorphism of a connected Dynkin diagram. The resulting root system is folding / restriction of the original root system. By construction, generators and relations are known from the diagonal case.

				only characteristic 3
Rank, Type of root system of $\mathfrak{B}(V)$	$A_n,\; n\geq 2$	$D_n,\; n\geq 4$	$E_6,E_7,E_8$	$B_n,\;n\geq 2$
Constructed from this diagonal Nichol algebra with $q_{ij}=\pm 1$	$A_n\times A_n$	$D_n\times D_n$	$E_n\times E_n$	$B_n\times B_n$ in characteristic 3.
Dimension of $V$	$2+2+\cdots$	$2+2+\cdots$	$2+2+\cdots$	$2+2+\cdots$
Dimension of Nichols algebra(s)	$\left(2^{n+1 \choose 2} \right)^2$	$\left(2^{n(n-1)} \right)^2$	$\left(2^{36} \right)^2,\;\left(2^{63} \right)^2,\;\left(2^{120} \right)^2$	$\left(3^{n(n-1)}2^{n} \right)^2$
Hilbert series	Same as the respective diagonal Nichols algebra			
Smallest realizing group	Extra special group (resp. almost extraspecial) with $2^{n+1}$ elements, except that $D_{n},\;2|n$ requires a similar group with larger center of order $2^3$.			
Source				
Comments				Supposedly a folding of the diagonal Nichols algebra of type $B_n$ with $q=\pm 1$ which exceptionally appears in characteristic 3.

The following two are obtained by proper automorphisms of the connected Dynkin diagrams ${^2}A_{2n-1},{^2}E_6$

Rank, Type of root system of $\mathfrak{B}(V)$	$C_{n},\; n\geq 3$	$F_4$
Constructed from this diagonal Nichol algebra with $q_{ij}=\pm 1$	$A_{2n-1}$	$E_6$
Dimension of $V$	$1+2+\cdots$	$1+1+2+2$
Dimension of Nichols algebra(s)	$2^{{2n \choose 2}}$	$2^{36}=68,719,476,736$
Hilbert series	Same as the respective diagonal Nichols algebra	Same as the respective diagonal Nichols algebra $(2)^6_{t} (2)^5_{t^2}(2)^5_{t^3}(2)^5_{t^4} (2)^4_{t^5}(2)^3_{t^6}$ $\cdot (2)^3_{t^7} (2)^2_{t^8} (2)_{t^9}(2)_{t^{10}}(2)_{t^{11}}$
Smallest realizing group	Group of order $2^{n+1}$ with larger center of order $2^2$ resp. $2^3$ (for $n$ even resp. odd)	Group of order $2^{4+1}$ with larger center of order $2^3$ i.e. $\mathbb{Z}_2\times \mathbb{Z}_2\times \mathbb{D}_4$
... and conjugacy class		$\mathcal{O}_{\{z_1\}}\oplus \mathcal{O}_{\{z_2\}} \oplus\mathcal{O}_{[x_1]}\oplus\mathcal{O}_{[y_1]}$
Source		

Note that there are several more foldings, such as ${^3}D_4,{^2}D_n$ and also some not of Lie type, but these violate the condition that the support generates the group.

== Poster with all Nichols algebras known so far ==
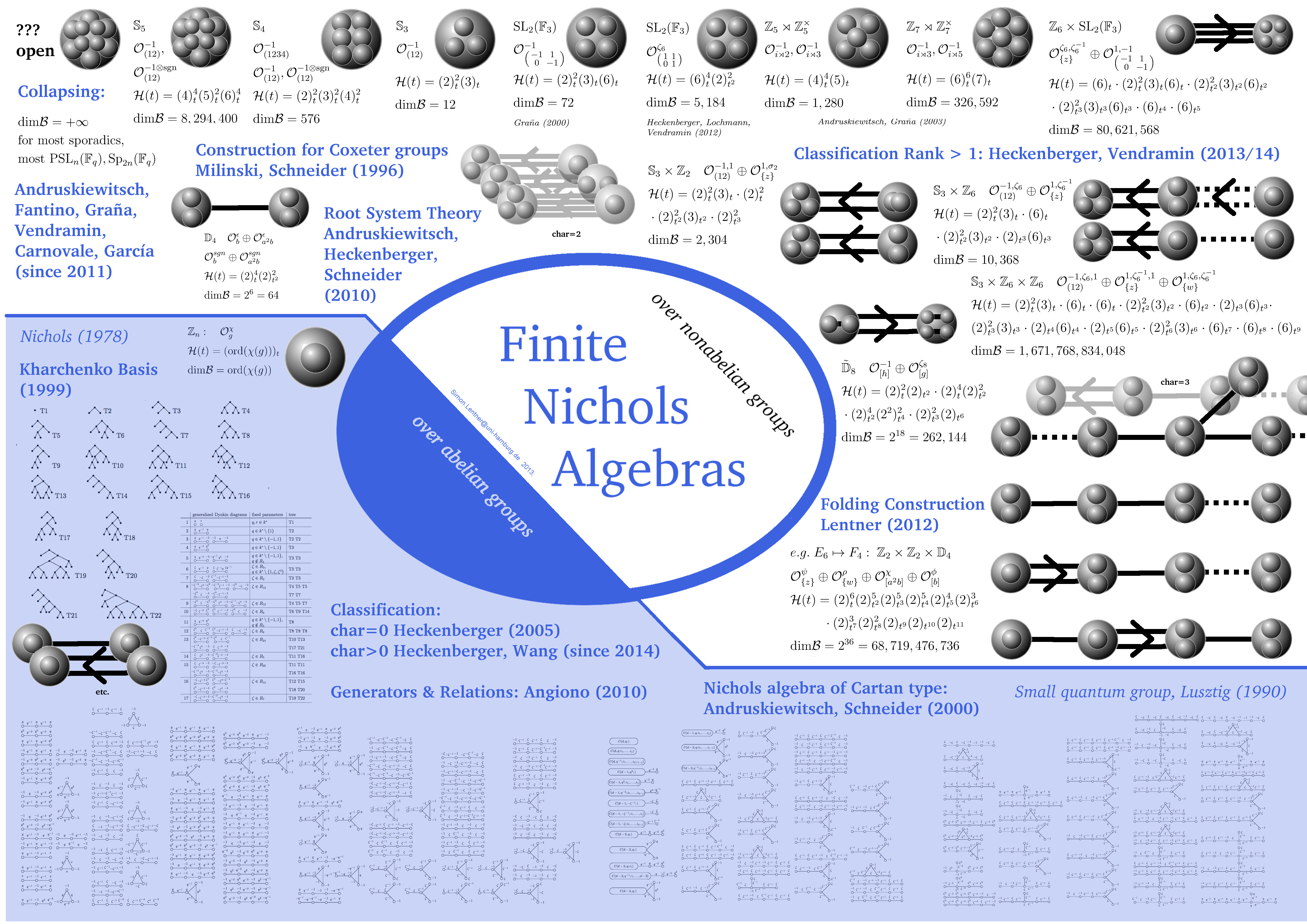

(Simon Lentner, University Hamburg, please feel free to write comments/corrections/wishes in this matter: simon.lentner at uni-hamburg.de)
