= Nichols algebra =

In algebra, the Nichols algebra of a braided vector space (with the braiding often induced by a finite group) is a braided Hopf algebra which is denoted by $\mathfrak{B}(V)$ and named after the mathematician Warren Nichols. It takes the role of quantum Borel part of a pointed Hopf algebra such as a quantum groups and their well known finite-dimensional truncations. Nichols algebras can immediately be used to write down new such quantum groups by using the Radford biproduct.

The classification of all such Nichols algebras and even all associated quantum groups (see Application) has been progressing rapidly, although still much is open: The case of an abelian group was solved in 2005, but otherwise this phenomenon seems to be very rare, with a handful examples known and powerful negation criteria established (see below). See also this List of finite-dimensional Nichols algebras.

The finite-dimensional theory is greatly governed by a theory of root systems and Dynkin diagrams, strikingly similar to those of semisimple Lie algebras. A comprehensive introduction is found in the lecture of Heckenberger.

== Definition ==
Consider a Yetter–Drinfeld module V in the Yetter–Drinfeld category ${}^H_H\mathcal{YD}$. This is especially a braided vectorspace, see Braided monoidal category.

The tensor algebra $TV$ of a Yetter–Drinfeld module $V\in {}^H_H\mathcal{YD}$ is always a Braided Hopf algebra. The coproduct $\Delta$ and counit $\epsilon$ of $TV$ is defined in such a way that the elements of $V$ are primitive, that is for all $v\in V$

$$\Delta(v)=1\otimes v+v\otimes 1$$
$$\epsilon(v)=0$$

The Nichols algebra can be uniquely defined by several equivalent characterizations, some of which focus on the Hopf algebra structure and some are more combinatorial. Regardless, determining the Nichols algebra explicitly (even decide if it's finite-dimensional) can be very difficult and is open in several concrete instances (see below).

=== Definition I: Combinatorical formula ===
Let $V$ be a braided vector space, this means there is an action of the braid group $\mathbb{B}_n$ on $V^{\otimes n}$ for any $n\in\mathbb{N}$, where the transposition $(i,i+1)$ acts as $id\otimes\cdots \otimes \tau\otimes id\cdots id$. Clearly there is a homomorphism to the symmetric group $\pi:\mathbb{B}_n\to\mathbb{S}_n$ but neither does this admit a section, nor does the action on $V^{\otimes n}$ in general factorize over this.

Consider nevertheless a set-theoretic section $s:\mathbb{S}_n\to \mathbb{B}_n$ sending transposition to transposition and arbitrary elements via any reduced expression. This is not a group homomorphism, but Matsumoto's theorem (group theory) tells us that the action of any $s(\sigma)$ on $V^{\otimes n}$ is well-defined independently of the choice of a reduced expression. Finally the Nichols algebra is then

$$\mathfrak{W}_n:=\sum_{\sigma\in\mathbb{S}_n} s(\sigma):\;\; V^{\otimes n}\to V^{\otimes n}\qquad \text{(quantum symmetrizer or quantum shuffle map)}$$

$$\mathfrak{B}(V):= \bigoplus_{n\geq 0} V^{\otimes n}/Ker(\mathfrak{W}_n)$$

This definition was later (but independently) given by Woronowicz. It has the disadvantage of being rarely useful in algebraic proofs but it represents an intuition in its own right and it has the didactical advantage of being very explicit and independent of the notation of a Hopf algebra.

=== Definition II: Prescribed primitives ===
The Nichols algebra $\mathfrak{B}(V)$ is the unique Hopf algebra in the braided category ${}^H_H\mathcal{YD}$ generated by the given $V\in {}^H_H\mathcal{YD}$, such that $V\subset \mathfrak{B}(V)$ are the only primitive elements.

This is the original definition due to Nichols and it makes very transparent the role of the Nichols algebra as a fundamental notion in the classification of Hopf algebras.

=== Definition III: Universal quotient ===
Let $V\in {}^H_H\mathcal{YD}$. There exists a largest ideal $\mathfrak{I}\subset TV$ with the following properties:

$$\mathfrak{I}\subset \bigoplus _{n=2}^\infty T^nV,$$

$\Delta (\mathfrak{I})\subset \mathfrak{I}\otimes TV+TV\otimes \mathfrak{I}$ (this is automatic)

The Nichols algebra is

$$\mathfrak{B}(V):= TV/\mathfrak{I}$$

=== Definition IV: Nondegenerate Pairing ===
The unique Hopf pairing $V\otimes TV^*\to k$ factorizes to a nondegenerate Hopf pairing between $\mathfrak{B}(V)\otimes \mathfrak{B}(V^*)\to k$ and this fact characterizes the Nichols algebra uniquely. This theoretically very helpful characterization is due to Lusztig.

=== Definition V: Skew derivatives ===
This is a somewhat explicit form of the previous definition: Chosen a homogeneous basis $v_i\in V$ (i.e. coaction/graduation $v_i\mapsto g_i\otimes v_i$) one may define skew derivations $\partial_i$, using the universal property of the tensor algebra:

$$\partial_i(1)=0 \quad \partial_i(v_j)=\delta_{ij}$$

$$\partial_i(ab)=a\partial_i(b)+\partial_i(a)(g_i.b)$$

Then the Nichols algebra $\mathfrak{B}(V)$ is the quotient of $TV$ by the largest homogeneous ideal which contains no constants and is invariant under all derivations $\partial_i$. Roughly spoken, one may look in $TV$ for elements in the kernel of all skew-derivations and divide these out; then look again for all elements that are now in the kernel of all skew-derivatives and divide them out as well etc.

== Examples ==
We give examples of finite-dimensional Nichols algebras. Over characteristic p, this effect already may appear in the non-braided situation, namely the truncated universal envelopings of p-restricted Lie algebras. In characteristic zero and with a braiding coming from an abelian group, this seems to be a similarly frequent occurrence (however more involved, see Classification). For G nonabelian on the other side, only very few examples are known so far, and powerful negation criteria exclude many groups at all (see Classification).

=== 1-dimensional examples ===
As a first example, consider the 1-dimensional Yetter–Drinfeld module $V_\pm=kx$ over the Group Hopf algebra H = k[Z/2Z] with the Cyclic group multiplicatively denoted (as usual in algebra) and generated by some g.

- Take as H-coaction (resp. Z/2Z-graduation) on $V_\pm$: $x\mapsto g\otimes x$
- Take as H-action (resp. Z/2Z-action) on $V_\pm$: $g\otimes x\mapsto \pm x$
- Thus the braiding is $x\otimes x\rightarrow \pm x\otimes x$

Then, depending on the sign choice, the Nichols algebras are:

$$\mathfrak{B}(V_+)=k[x]\qquad \mathfrak{B}(V_-)=k[x]/(x^2)$$

Note that the first is as expected (the non-braided case), while the second has been truncated to the point that it's finite-dimensional! Similarly, V_{q} over a higher cyclic group with g acting by some q in k has Nichols algebra $\mathfrak{B}(V_q)=k[x]/(x^n)$ if q ≠ 1 is a primitive n-th root of unity, and $\mathfrak{B}(V_q)=k[x]$ otherwise.

(from a physical perspective, the V_{+} corresponds to a boson, while V_{–} represents a fermion restricted by Pauli exclusion principle; an analogy that repeats when considering braided commutators, being (anti)commutators in these cases, see also Supersymmetry as a quantum group and discussion)

=== Higher-rank examples over G abelian: braided commutators ===
The next examples show the interaction of two basis elements: Consider the two-dimensional Yetter–Drinfeld module V_{0,1} = kx ⊕ ky over the group Hopf algebra H = k[Z/2Z × Z/2Z] with the Klein four group multiplicatively denoted and generated by some g,h.

- Take as H-coaction/graduation on V_{0,1}: $x\mapsto g\otimes x$ and $x\mapsto g\otimes x$
- Take as H-action (resp. Z/2Z-action) on V_{0,1}:
  - $g\otimes x\mapsto -x$
  - $g\otimes y\mapsto +y$
  - $h\otimes y\mapsto -y$
  - $h\otimes x\mapsto \pm x$ with "+" for V_{0} (symmetric) and "–" for V_{1} (asymmetric)
- Thus the braiding is
  - $x\otimes x\rightarrow -x\otimes x$
  - $y\otimes y\rightarrow -y\otimes y$
  - $x\otimes y\rightarrow y\otimes x$
  - $y\otimes x\rightarrow \pm x\otimes y$

Then, depending on the sign choice, the Nichols algebras are of dimension 4 and 8 (they appear in the classification under $q_{12}q_{21}=\pm 1$):

$$\mathfrak{B}(V_0)=k[x,y]/(x^2,y^2,xy+yx),$$
$$\mathfrak{B}(V_1)=k[x]/(x^2,y^2,xyxy+yxyx)$$

There one can see the striking resemblance to Semisimple Lie algebras: In the first case, the braided commutator [x, y] (here: anticommutator) is zero, while in the second, the root string is longer [x, [x, y]] = 0. Hence these two belong to Dynkin diagrams $A_1\cup A_1$ and A_{2}.

One also constructs examples with even longer root strings V_{2}, V_{3} corresponding to Dynkin diagrams B_{2}, G_{2} (but as well no higher ones).

=== Universal enveloping of Lie algebras, Quantum groups ===
Nichols algebras are probably best known for being the Borel part of the quantum groups and their generalizations. More precisely let

$$V:=x_1\mathbb{C}\oplus x_2\mathbb{C}\oplus\cdots \oplus x_n\mathbb{C}$$

be the diagonal Yetter-Drinfel'd module over an abelian group $\Lambda=\mathbb{Z}^n=\langle K_1,\ldots,K_n\rangle$ with braiding

$$x_i\otimes x_j\mapsto q_{ij} x_j\otimes x_i\qquad q_{ij}:=q^{(\alpha_i,\alpha_j)}$$

where $(\alpha_i,\alpha_j)$ is the Killing form of a semisimple (finite-dimensional) Lie algebra $\mathfrak{g}$, then the Nichols algebra is the positive part of Lusztig's small quantum group

$$\mathfrak{B}(V)=u_q(\mathfrak{g})^+$$

=== Includes Super-Lie algebras ===
There are more diagonal Nichols algebras than Lie algebras in Heckenbergers list, and the root system theory is systematic, but more complicated (see below). In particular is contains also the classification of Super-Lie-Algebras (example below) as well as certain Lie algebras and Super-Lie-Algebras that only appear in a specific finite characteristic.

Thus Nichols algebra theory and root system theory provides a unified framework for these concepts.

=== Nondiagonal braidings, Nonabelian groups ===
Only a handful of finite-dimensional Nichols algebras over k = C are known so far. It is known that in this case each irreducible Yetter–Drinfeld module $\mathcal{O}_{[g]}^\chi$ corresponds to Conjugacy class of the group (together with an irreducible representation of the centralizer of g). An arbitrary Yetter–Drinfeld module is a direct sum of such $\mathcal{O}_{[g]}^\chi$, the number of summands is called rank; each summand corresponds to anode in the Dynkin diagram (see below). Note that for the abelian groups as above, the irreducible summands are 1-dimensional, hence rank and dimension coincide.

Particular examples include the Nichols algebra associated to the conjugacy class(es) of reflections in a Coxeter group, they are related to the Fomin Kirilov algebras. It is known these Nichols algebras are finite dimensional for $\mathbb{S}_3,\mathbb{S}_4,\mathbb{S}_5,\mathbb{D}_4$ but already the case $\mathbb{S}_6$ is open since 2000. Another class of examples can be constructed from abelian case by a folding through diagram automorphisms.

See here for a list List of finite-dimensional Nichols algebras to the extent of our knowledge.

== Root system ==
A very remarkable feature is that for every Nichols algebra (under sufficient finiteness conditions) there exists a generalized root system with a set of roots $\Phi$, which controls the Nichols algebra. This has been discovered in for diagonal Nichols algebras in terms of the bicharacter $q_{ij}$ and in for general semisimple Nichols algebras. In contrast to ordinary crystallographic root systems known from Lie algebras, the same generalized root system $\Phi$ may possess several be different Weyl chambers, corresponding to non-equivalent choices of sets of positive roots $\Phi=\Phi^+\cup -\Phi^+$ and simple positive roots $\alpha_1,\ldots \alpha_n$, having different Cartan matrices and different Dynkin diagrams.

The different Weyl chambers correspond in fact to different non-isomorphic Nichols algebras which are called Weyl-equivalent. Quantum groups are very special with respect to the fact that here all Borel parts are isomorphic; nevertheless even in this case Lusztig's reflection operator $T_s$ is again not a Hopf algebra isomorphism!

=== Definition of Weyl groupoid and generalized roots system ===
Let $I=\{1,\ldots n\}$ where $n$ is the rank, with formal basis $\alpha_1,\ldots \alpha_n$.

We first discuss generalized Cartan graphs as in:

- A generalized Cartan matrix $c_{ij},\;\;i,j\in I$ is an integral matrix such that
  - $c_{ii}=2,\quad c_{ij}<0$
  - $c_{ij}=0\Rightarrow c_{ji}=0$
- A Cartan graph is a set of such Cartan matrices $c^a_{ij},\;\forall a\in A$ parametrized by a set of objects/chambers $A$, together with (object change) morphism $r_i:A\to A$ such that
  - $r_i^2=id$
  - $c^a_{ij}=c^{r_i(a)}_{ij}$
- Define maps

$$s_i^a:\mathbb{Z}^I\to \mathbb{Z}^I$$
$$s_i^a:\;\alpha_j\mapsto \alpha_j-c_{ij}^a \alpha_i$$

(note that Lie algebra literature has also the transpose convention for $c_{ij}$, e.g. in Humphrey's book)

- The Weyl groupoid is the category with objects $A$ and morphisms $Hom(a,b)$ formally the groups generated by the $s_i^a:a\to r_i(a)$
- The set of real roots $\Phi_a^+$ is the set $\{ id ^a s _{i_1}\cdots s_{i_k}(\alpha_j)\,|\, k\in \mathbb{N}_0,\,i_1,\dots,i_k,j\in I\}\subseteq \mathbb{N}^I$
- Define $m_{i,j}^a= |\Phi ^a \cap (\mathbb{N}_0 \alpha_i + \mathbb{N}_0 \alpha_j)|$,
- Then a root system $\Phi$ of type $(c_{i,j}^a)_{a\in A}$ is a set
  - $\Phi^a=\Phi^a_+\cup - \Phi^a_+$ with $\Phi^a_+=\Phi^a\cap \mathbb{N}_0^I$
  - $\Phi^a\cap \mathbb{Z}\alpha_i=\{\alpha_i,-\alpha_i\}$
  - $s_i^a(\Phi^a) = \Phi^{r_i(a)}$
  - For $i\neq j$ with $m_{ij}$ finite $(r_i r_j)^{m_{i,j}^a}(a)=a$

=== Equivalence to Crystallographic Hyperplane Arrangements ===
In it was shown that Weyl groupoids are in 1:1 correspondence to crystallographic hyperplane arrangements. These are a set of hyperplanes in $\mathbb{R}^n$ through the origin and choices of normal vectors such that for every simplicial chamber bounded by $n$ hyperplanes with normal vectors $\alpha_1^\perp,\ldots \alpha_n^\perp$ all other chosen normal vector $\alpha^\perp$ can be expressed as integral linear combination of the $\alpha_i^\perp$.

In the set of all finite crystallographic hyperplane arrangements (and hence finite Weyl groupoids or finite generalized root systems) have been classified. Apart from the reflection arrangements $A_n,B_n,C_n,D_n,E_6,E_7,E_8,F_4,G_2$ there is one more infinite family and altogether 74 exceptionswith rank up to $8$.

=== Example of rank 3 (also a super Lie algebra) ===
The smallest crystallographic hyperplane arrangement, Weyl groupoid, generalized root system, which is not of ordinary Lie type, is as follows. It appears for a diagonal Nichols algebra, even a super Lie algebra. The hyperplane arrangement can be constructed from a cuboctahedron (a platonic solid):

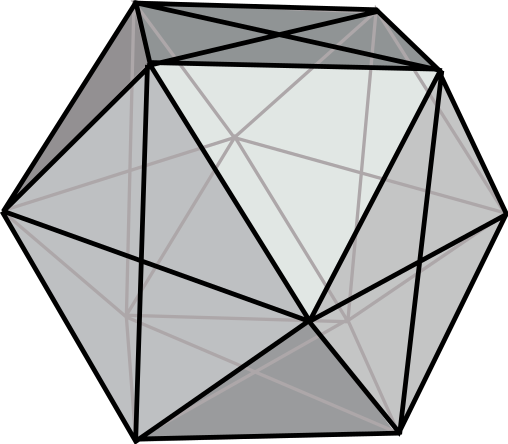

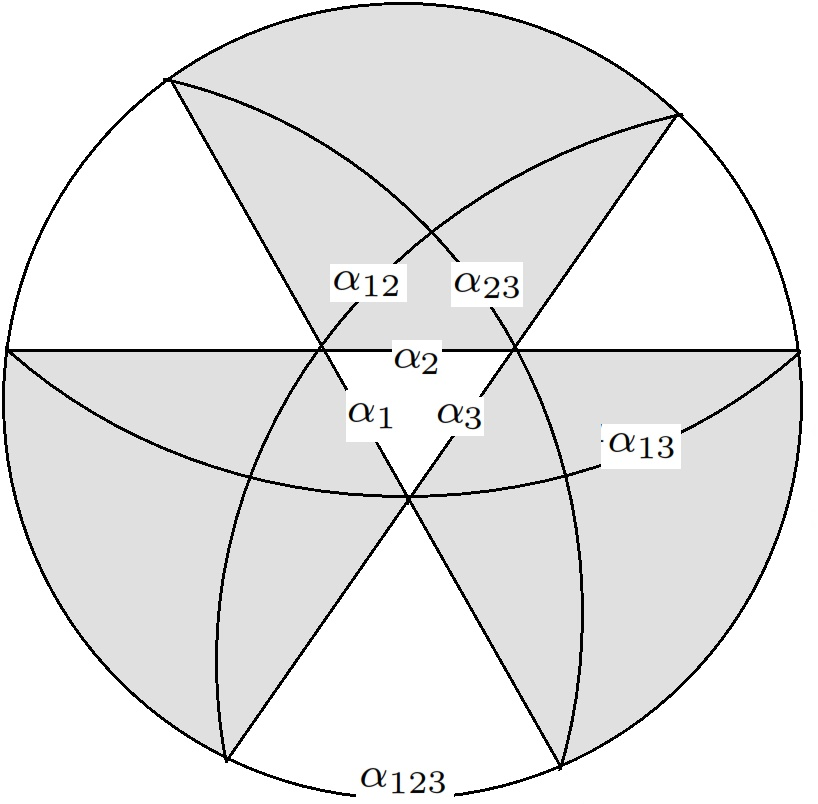

It has $7$ roots ($4$ resp. $3$ hyperplanes, in the pictures bounding equilateral triangle resp. diagonals in squares, in the super Lie algebra odd resp. even roots). It visibly has $2$ different types of Weyl chambers (equilateral triangles resp. right triangles) with different Cartan matrices in which the roots in terms of simple roots are as follows:

$$\Phi^a_+=\{(1,0,0),(0,1,0),(0,0,1),(1,1,0),(1,0,1),(0,1,1),(1,1,1)\}$$
In the picture the white chamber, e.g with basis $\alpha_1,\alpha_2,\alpha_3$. Clearly, the Dynkin diagram of this type of chamber $a\in A$ is a simply-laced triangle,

Reflection on $\alpha_2$ brings us to the second type of chamber

$$\Phi^{a'}_+=\{(1,0,0),(0,1,0),(0,0,1),(1,1,0),(0,1,1),(1,1,1),(1,2,1)\}$$
In the picture the gray chamber, e.g with basis $\alpha_1',\alpha_2',\alpha_3'=\alpha_{12},-\alpha_2,\alpha_{23}$. The Dynkin diagram of this type of chamber $a'\in A$ is just $A_2$ (but one more root).

This root system is the smallest member of an infinite series. The pictures are from, where the example is also discussed thoroughly.

== Classification (Details) ==
=== Over abelian groups ===
The Nichols algebras of finite dimension over abelian groups in k = C were classified by Istvan Heckenberger in the years 2004–2005 by classifying arithmetic root systems and generalized Dynkin diagrams; where already Kharchenko had proven them to possess a Poincaré–Birkhoff–Witt basis of iterated (braided) commutators. The only information one requires is the braiding matrix, which is diagonal in this setting (see examples above)

$$x_i\otimes x_j \mapsto q_{ij}x_j\otimes x_i$$

While mostly only the classical Cartan-cases appear, there are several exotic diagrams possible for small primes, such as a triangle

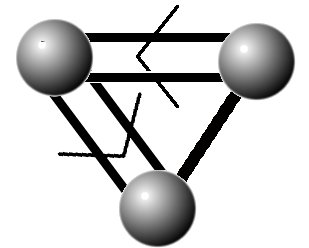
A rank 3 Dynkin diagram associated to a finite-dimensional Nichols algebra

In these cases the Weyl reflections of one diagram may not land in the "same" diagram, but a so-called Weyl equivalent. This is also the exact reason, that these exotic cases possess a Weyl-groupoid instead of a usual group.

The generators and relations of a Nichols algebra are not readily available from the root system. Rather, one has to perform tedious work with the Lynond words. This has been completely done in

=== Negative criteria: abelian subracks ===
Especially for irreducible V there are no submodules; however one may use the more abstract notion of subrack only reflecting the braiding of two contained elements. In several papers, Nicolas Andruskiewitsch et al. gave negative criteria excluding groups at all from possessing (indecomposable) Nichols algebras. Their techniques can be roughly summarized (more details!):

Consider a subrack that is abelian, check which representation may be inherited from the larger rack, and looked up in Heckenbegers List

This ansatz puts sometimes strong conditions especially on the braiding of any g-graded element x with itself (e.g. the first example above shows q ≠ 1). Note that because g is central in the centralizer, it acts on the irreducible representation by a scalar as a consequence of the Schur lemma; hence this selfbraiding resp. 1-dim sub-Yetter-Drinfeld module / braided vectorspace / 1-dim subrack is diagonal

$$x\otimes x\;\stackrel{\tau}{\longmapsto}\;q(x\otimes x)\;\;\Longleftrightarrow\;\; g.x=qx$$

It is usually used to excludes g e.g. of being of odd order and/or χ of high dimension:

- If g is real (i.e. conjugated to its inverse) then q = –1 (especially g has to be of even order)
- If g is quasi-real (i.e. conjugated to some j-th power) then
  - either q = –1 as above
  - or $g^{(j^2)}=g$ and the representation χ is one-dimensional with q = ζ_{3} a primitive 3rd root of unity (especially the order of g is divisible by 3)
- If contrary g is an involution and some centralizing h = tgt then the eigenvalues of the h (viewed as matrix) acting on $\mathcal{O}_{[g]}^\chi$ is strongly restricted.

=== Root systems over nonabelian groups ===
The existence of a root system also in the nonabelian case implies rather immediately the following very strong implications:

Immediate consequences are implied for rank 2 Nichols algebras $\mathfrak{B}\left(\mathcal{O}_{[g]}\oplus\mathcal{O}_{[h]}\right)$ which g, h discommuting; then:

- The braided commutators [x, y] of elements $x\in\mathcal{O}_{[g]}\; y\in\mathcal{O}_{[h]}$ are not all zero.
- The space of braided commutators $ad_{\mathcal{O}_{[g]}}\mathcal{O}_{[h]}=[\mathcal{O}_{[g]},\mathcal{O}_{[h]}]$ form an irreducible sub-Yetter–Drinfeld module $\mathcal{O}_{[gh]}$ (i.e. the root is unique as in the Lie algebra case)
- They're '"close to commuting" $\;(gh)^2=(hg)^2$

This implies roughly, that finite-dimensional Nichols algebras over nonabelian groups have to be (if at all) of very low rank or the group has to be close-to-abelian.

=== Negative criteria: nonabelian subracks (type D) ===
As the abelian subracks use the structural classification of Heckenberger for Nichols algebras over abelian groups (see above) one can also consider nonabelian subracks. If such a subrack decomposes into several pieces (because now less element are present to conjugate), then the above results on root systems apply.

A specific case where this is highly successful is type D, i.e. for $r,s\in [g]\;$

- r, s not conjugate in the generated subgroup $\langle r,s\rangle\;$
- $(rs)^2\neq(sr)^2\;$

in this case the Nichols algebra of the subrack is infinite-dimensional and so is the entire Nichols algebra

=== Known groups not admitting finite-dimensional Nichols algebras ===
Both negation techniques above have been very fruitful to negate (indecomposable) finite-dimensional Nichols algebras:

- for Alternating groups $\mathbb{A}_{n\geq 5}$
- for Symmetric groups $\mathbb{S}_{n\geq 6}$ except a short list of examples
- some group of Lie type (sources, complete list?)
- all Sporadic groups except a short list of possibilities (resp. conjugacy classes in ATLAS notation) that are all real or j = 3-quasireal:
  - ...for the Fischer group $Fi_{22}\;$ the classes $22A,22B\;$
  - ...for the baby monster group B the classes $16C,\;16D,\;32A,\;32B,\;32C,\;32D,\;34A,\;46A,\;46B\;$
  - ...for the monster group M the classes $32A,\;32B,\;46A,\;46B,\;92A,\;92B,\;94A,\;94B\;$

Usually a large amount of conjugacy classes ae of type D ("not commutative enough"), while the others tend to possess sufficient abelian subracks and can be excluded by their consideration. Several cases have to be done by-hand. Note that the open cases tend to have very small centralizers (usually cyclic) and representations χ (usually the 1-dimensional sign representation). Significant exceptions are the conjugacy classes of order 16, 32 having as centralizers p-groups of order 2048 resp. 128 and currently no restrictions on χ.

== Applications ==
The Nichols algebra appears as quantum Borel part in the classification of finite-dimensional pointed Hopf algebras (without small primes) by Nicolas Andruskiewitsch and Hans-Jürgen Schneider, especially Quantum groups. For example, $U_q(\mathfrak{g})$ and their well known truncations for q a root of unity decompose just like an ordinary Semisimple Lie algebra into E´s (Borel part), dual F´s and K´s (Cartan algebra):

$$U_q(\mathfrak{g})\cong \left(\mathfrak{B}(V)\otimes k[\mathbb{Z}^n]\otimes\mathfrak{B}(V^*)\right)^\sigma$$

Here, as in the classical theory V is a vectorspace of dimension n (the rank of $\mathfrak{g}$) spanned by the E´s, and σ (a so-called cocycle twist) creates the nontrivial linking between E´s and F´s. Note that in contrast to classical theory, more than two linked components may appear. See cit. loc. for an exotic example with 4 parts of type A_{3}.

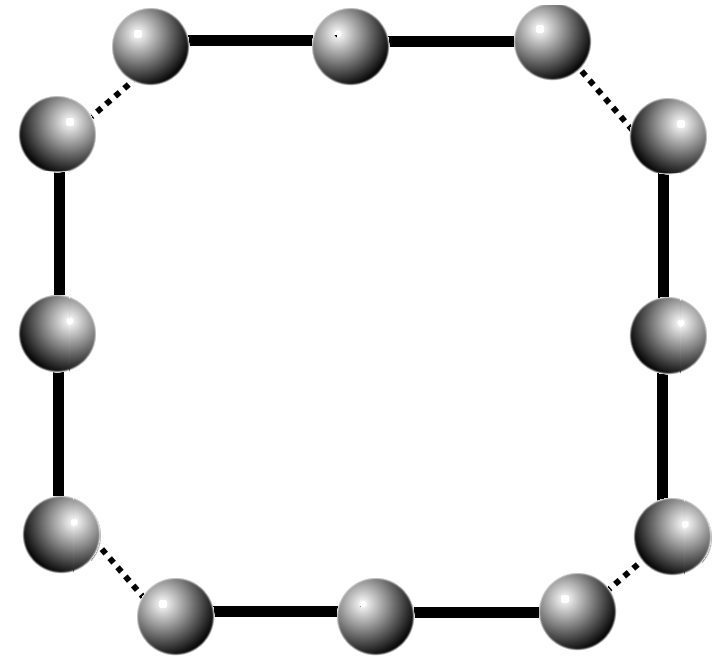
generalized Dynkin diagram for a pointed Hopf algebra linking four A3 copies

The classification roughly reduces a given hypothetical example to a Radford biproduct of the (coradical-) group and the (connected-) part, which contains the Nichols algebra, by taking the corresponding "graded object" (killing all linkings). With the knowledge from the classification of finite-dimensional Nichols algebras above, the authors prove no additional elements to appear in the connected part (generation in degree 1), and finally describe all possible liftings as "dotted lines" in generalized Dynkin diagrams.

Recently, this correspondence has been greatly extended to identify certain so-called coideal subalgebras to be in 1:1 correspondence to the Weyl group, which has been conjectured as "numerical coincidence" earlier and proven in certain cases by-hand.
