= Quantum spacetime =

Concept in theoretical mathematical physics

In mathematical physics, the concept of quantum spacetime is a generalization of the usual concept of spacetime in which some variables that ordinarily commute are assumed not to commute and form a different Lie algebra. The choice of that algebra varies from one theory to another. As a result of this change, some variables that are usually continuous may become discrete. Often only such discrete variables are called "quantized"; usage varies.

The idea of quantum spacetime was proposed in the early days of quantum theory by Heisenberg and Ivanenko as a way to eliminate infinities from quantum field theory. The germ of the idea passed from Heisenberg to Rudolf Peierls, who noted that electrons in a magnetic field can be regarded as moving in a quantum spacetime, and to Robert Oppenheimer, who carried it to Hartland Snyder, who published the first concrete example. Snyder's Lie algebra was made simple by C. N. Yang in the same year.

== Overview ==
Physical spacetime is a quantum spacetime when in quantum mechanics position and momentum variables $x,p$ are already noncommutative, obey the Heisenberg uncertainty principle, and are continuous. Because of the Heisenberg uncertainty relations, greater energy is needed to probe smaller distances. Ultimately, according to gravity theory, the probing particles form black holes that destroy what was to be measured. The process cannot be repeated, so it cannot be considered to be a measurement. This limited measurability led many to expect that the usual picture of continuous commutative spacetime breaks down at Planck scale distances, if not sooner.

Physical spacetime is expected to be quantum because physical coordinates are slightly noncommutative. The astronomical coordinates of a star are modified by gravitational fields between the observer and the star, as in the deflection of light by the sun, one of the classic tests of general relativity. Therefore, the coordinates actually depend on gravitational field variables. According to quantum theories of gravity, these field variables do not commute; therefore coordinates that depend on them likely do not commute.

Both arguments are based on pure gravity and quantum theory, and they limit the measurement of time by the only time constant in pure quantum gravity, the Planck time. Instruments, however, are not purely gravitational but are made of particles. They may set a more severe, larger, limit than the Planck time.

== Criteria ==
Quantum spacetimes are often described mathematically using the noncommutative geometry of Connes, quantum geometry, or quantum groups.

Any noncommutative algebra with at least four generators could be interpreted as a quantum spacetime, but the following desiderata have been suggested:

- Local Lorentz group and Poincaré group symmetries should be retained, possibly in a generalised form. Their generalisation often takes the form of a quantum group acting on the quantum spacetime algebra.
- The algebra might plausibly arise in an effective description of quantum gravity effects in some regime of that theory. For example, a physical parameter $\lambda$, perhaps the Planck length, might control the deviation from commutative classical spacetime, so that ordinary Lorentzian spacetime arises as $\lambda\to 0$.
- There might be a notion of quantum differential calculus on the quantum spacetime algebra, compatible with the (quantum) symmetry and preferably reducing to the usual differential calculus as $\lambda\to 0$.

This would permit wave equations for particles and fields and facilitate predictions for experimental deviations from classical spacetime physics that can then be tested experimentally.

- The Lie algebra should be semisimple. This makes it easier to formulate a finite theory.

== Models ==
Several models were found in the 1990s more or less meeting most of the above criteria.

=== Bicrossproduct model spacetime ===
The bicrossproduct model spacetime was introduced by Shahn Majid and Henri Ruegg and has Lie algebra relations

$$[x_i,x_j]=0,\quad [x_i, t]=i \lambda x_i$$

for the spatial variables $x_i$ and the time variable $t$. Here $\lambda$ has dimensions of time and is therefore expected to be something like the Planck time. The Poincaré group here is correspondingly deformed, now to a certain bicrossproduct quantum group with the following characteristic features.

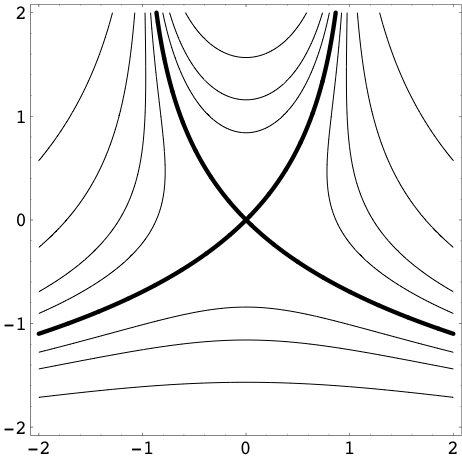
Orbits for the action of the Lorentz group on momentum space in the construction of the bicrossproduct model in units of $\lambda^{-1}$. Mass-shell hyperboloids are 'squashed' into a cylinder.

The momentum generators $p_i$ commute among themselves but addition of momenta, reflected in the quantum group structure, is deformed (momentum space becomes a non-abelian group). Meanwhile, the Lorentz group generators enjoy their usual relations among themselves but act non-linearly on the momentum space. The orbits for this action are depicted in the figure as a cross-section of $p_0$ against one of the $p_i$. The on-shell region describing particles in the upper center of the image would normally be hyperboloids but these are now 'squashed' into the cylinder

$$\sqrt{p_1^2+p_2^2+p_3^2}< \lambda^{-1} \,$$

in simplified units. The upshot is that Lorentz-boosting a momentum will never increase it above the Planck momentum. The existence of a highest momentum scale or lowest distance scale fits the physical picture. This squashing comes from the non-linearity of the Lorentz boost and is an endemic feature of bicrossproduct quantum groups known since their introduction in 1988. Some physicists dub the bicrossproduct model doubly special relativity, since it sets an upper limit to both speed and momentum.

Another consequence of the squashing is that the propagation of particles is deformed, even of light, leading to a variable speed of light. This prediction requires the particular $p_0,p_i$ to be the physical energy and spatial momentum (as opposed to some other function of them). Arguments for this identification were provided in 1999 by Giovanni Amelino-Camelia and Majid through a study of plane waves for a quantum differential calculus in the model. They take the form

$$e^{i \sum_ip_ix_i} e^{i p_0 t} \,$$

In other words, a form which is sufficiently close to classical that one might plausibly believe the interpretation. At the moment, such wave analysis represents the best hope to obtain physically testable predictions from the model.

Prior to this work there were a number of unsupported claims to make predictions from the model based solely on the form of the Poincaré quantum group. There were also claims based on an earlier $\kappa$-Poincaré quantum group introduced by Jurek Lukierski and co-workers which were important precursors to the bicrossproduct, albeit without the actual quantum spacetime and with different proposed generators for which the above picture does not apply. The bicrossproduct model spacetime has also been called $\kappa$-deformed spacetime with $\kappa=\lambda^{-1}$.

=== q-Deformed spacetime ===
This model was introduced independently by a team working under Julius Wess in 1990 and by Shahn Majid and coworkers in a series of papers on braided matrices starting a year later. The point of view in the second approach is that usual Minkowski spacetime has a description via Pauli matrices as the space of 2 x 2 hermitian matrices. In quantum group theory and using braided monoidal category methods, a natural q-version of this is defined here for real values of $q$ as a 'braided hermitian matrix' of generators and relations

$$\begin{pmatrix}\alpha & \beta\\ \gamma &\delta\end{pmatrix}=\begin{pmatrix}\alpha & \beta\\ \gamma &\delta\end{pmatrix}^\dagger,\quad \beta\alpha=q^2\alpha\beta,\  [\alpha,\delta]=0,\ [\beta,\gamma]=(1-q^{-2})\alpha(\delta-\alpha),\ [\delta,\beta]=(1-q^{-2})\alpha\beta$$

These relations say that the generators commute as $q\to 1$ thereby recovering usual Minkowski space. Working with more familiar variables $x,y,z,t$ as linear combinations of these, in particular, time

$$t = \text{Trace}_q \begin{pmatrix} \alpha & \beta\\ \gamma &\delta\end{pmatrix} = q\delta+q^{-1}\alpha$$

is given by a natural braided trace of the matrix and commutes with the other generators (so this model is different from the bicrossproduct one). The braided-matrix picture also leads naturally to a quantity

$${\det}_q\begin{pmatrix}\alpha & \beta\\ \gamma &\delta\end{pmatrix}=\alpha\delta-q^2\gamma\beta$$

which as $q\to 1$ returns the usual Minkowski distance (this translates to a metric in the quantum differential geometry). The parameter $q=e^{\lambda}$ or $q=e^{i \lambda}$ is dimensionless and $\lambda$ is thought to be a ratio of the Planck scale and the cosmological length. That is, there are indications that this model relates to quantum gravity with a non-zero cosmological constant, the choice of $q$ depending on whether this is positive or negative. This describes the mathematically better understood but perhaps less physically justified positive case.

A full understanding of this model requires (and was concurrent with the development of) a full theory of 'braided linear algebra' for such spaces. The momentum space for the theory is another copy of the same algebra and there is a certain 'braided addition' of momentum on it expressed as the structure of a braided Hopf algebra or quantum group in a certain braided monoidal category). This theory, by 1993, had provided the corresponding $q$-deformed Poincaré group as generated by such translations and $q$-Lorentz transformations, completing the interpretation as a quantum spacetime.

In the process it was discovered that the Poincaré group not only had to be deformed but had to be extended to include dilations of the quantum spacetime. For such a theory to be exact, all particles in the theory need to be massless, which is consistent with experiment, as masses of elementary particles are vanishingly small compared to the Planck mass. If current thinking in cosmology is correct, then this model is more appropriate, but it is significantly more complicated and for this reason its physical predictions have yet to be worked out.

=== Fuzzy or spin model spacetime ===
This refers in modern usage to the angular momentum algebra

$$[x_1,x_2]= 2 i \lambda x_3,\ [x_2,x_3]= 2 i \lambda x_1,\ [x_3,x_1]= 2 i \lambda x_2$$

familiar from quantum mechanics but interpreted in this context as coordinates of a quantum space or spacetime. These relations were proposed by Roger Penrose in his earliest spin network theory of space. It is a toy model of quantum gravity in 3 spacetime dimensions (not the physical 4) with a Euclidean (not the physical Minkowskian) signature. It was again proposed in this context by Gerardus 't Hooft. A further development including a quantum differential calculus and an action of a certain 'quantum double' quantum group as deformed Euclidean group of motions was given by Majid and E. Batista.

A striking feature of the noncommutative geometry, is that the smallest covariant quantum differential calculus has one dimension higher than expected, namely 4, suggesting that the above can also be viewed as the spatial part of a 4-dimensional quantum spacetime. The model should not be confused with fuzzy spheres which are finite-dimensional matrix algebras which can be thought of as spheres in the spin model spacetime of fixed radius.

=== Heisenberg model spacetimes ===
The quantum spacetime of Hartland Snyder proposes that

$$[x_\mu,x_\nu]= i M_{\mu\nu}$$

where the $M_{\mu\nu}$ generate the Lorentz group. This quantum spacetime and that of C. N. Yang entail a radical unification of spacetime, energy-momentum, and angular momentum.

The idea was revived in a modern context by Sergio Doplicher, Klaus Fredenhagen and John Roberts in 1995, by letting $M_{\mu\nu}$ simply be viewed as some function of $x_\mu$ as defined by the above relation, and any relations involving it viewed as higher order relations among the $x_\mu$. The Lorentz symmetry is arranged so as to transform the indices as usual and without being deformed.

An even simpler variant of this model is to let $M$ be a numerical antisymmetric tensor, in which context it is usually denoted $\theta$, so the relations are $[x_\mu,x_\nu]= i \theta_{\mu\nu}$. In even dimensions $D$, any nondegenerate such theta can be transformed to a normal form in which this really is just the Heisenberg algebra but the difference that the variables are being proposed as those of spacetime. This proposal was once popular because of its familiar form of relations and because it has been argued that it emerges from the theory of open strings landing on D-branes, see noncommutative quantum field theory and Moyal plane. However, this D-brane lives in some of the higher spacetime dimensions in the theory and hence it is not physical spacetime that string theory suggests to be effectively quantum in this way. It also requires subscribing to D-branes as an approach to quantum gravity in the first place. When posited as quantum spacetime, it is hard to obtain physical predictions and one reason for this is that if $\theta$ is a tensor, then by dimensional analysis, it should have dimensions of length${}^2$, and if this length is speculated to be the Planck length, then the effects would be harder to ever detect than for other models.

== Noncommutative extensions to spacetime ==
Although not quantum spacetime in the sense above, another use of noncommutative geometry is to tack on 'noncommutative extra dimensions' at each point of ordinary spacetime. Instead of invisible curled up extra dimensions as in string theory, Alain Connes and coworkers have argued that the coordinate algebra of this extra part should be replaced by a finite-dimensional noncommutative algebra. For a certain reasonable choice of this algebra, its representation and extended Dirac operator, the Standard Model of elementary particles can be recovered. In this point of view, the different kinds of matter particles are manifestations of geometry in these extra noncommutative directions. Connes's first works here date from 1989 but has been developed considerably since then. Such an approach can theoretically be combined with quantum spacetime as above.

== See also ==
- Quantum group
- Quantum geometry
- Noncommutative geometry
- Quantum gravity
- Anabelian topology
- Quantum reference frame
