= Braided Hopf algebra =

In mathematics, a braided Hopf algebra is a Hopf algebra in a braided monoidal category. The most common braided Hopf algebras are objects in a Yetter–Drinfeld category of a Hopf algebra H, particularly the Nichols algebra of a braided vector space in that category.

The notion should not be confused with quasitriangular Hopf algebra.

== Definition ==
Let H be a Hopf algebra over a field k, and assume that the antipode of H is bijective. A Yetter–Drinfeld module R over H is called a braided bialgebra in the Yetter–Drinfeld category ${}^H_H\mathcal{YD}$ if

- $(R,\cdot ,\eta )$ is a unital associative algebra, where the multiplication map $\cdot :R\times R\to R$ and the unit $\eta :k\to R$ are maps of Yetter–Drinfeld modules,
- $(R,\Delta ,\varepsilon )$ is a coassociative coalgebra with counit $\varepsilon$, and both $\Delta$ and $\varepsilon$ are maps of Yetter–Drinfeld modules,
- the maps $\Delta :R\to R\otimes R$ and $\varepsilon :R\to k$ are algebra maps in the category ${}^H_H\mathcal{YD}$, where the algebra structure of $R\otimes R$ is determined by the unit $\eta \otimes \eta(1) : k\to R\otimes R$ and the multiplication map

$$(R\otimes R)\times (R\otimes R)\to R\otimes R,\quad (r\otimes s,t\otimes u) \mapsto \sum _i rt_i\otimes s_i u, \quad \text{and}\quad c(s\otimes t)=\sum _i t_i\otimes s_i.$$

Here c is the canonical braiding in the Yetter–Drinfeld category ${}^H_H\mathcal{YD}$.

A braided bialgebra in ${}^H_H\mathcal{YD}$ is called a braided Hopf algebra, if there is a morphism $S:R\to R$ of Yetter–Drinfeld modules such that

$S(r^{(1)})r^{(2)}=r^{(1)}S(r^{(2)})=\eta(\varepsilon (r))$ for all $r\in R,$

where $\Delta _R(r)=r^{(1)}\otimes r^{(2)}$ in slightly modified Sweedler notation – a change of notation is performed in order to avoid confusion in Radford's biproduct below.

== Examples ==
- Any Hopf algebra is also a braided Hopf algebra over $H=k$
- A super Hopf algebra is nothing but a braided Hopf algebra over the group algebra $H=k[\mathbb{Z}/2\mathbb{Z}]$.
- The tensor algebra $TV$ of a Yetter–Drinfeld module $V\in {}^H_H\mathcal{YD}$ is always a braided Hopf algebra. The coproduct $\Delta$ of $TV$ is defined in such a way that the elements of V are primitive, that is

$$\Delta (v)=1\otimes v+v\otimes 1 \quad \text{for all}\quad v\in V.$$

The counit $\varepsilon :TV\to k$ then satisfies the equation $\varepsilon (v)=0$ for all $v\in V .$

- The universal quotient of $TV$, that is still a braided Hopf algebra containing $V$ as primitive elements is called the Nichols algebra. They take the role of quantum Borel algebras in the classification of pointed Hopf algebras, analogously to the classical Lie algebra case.

== Radford's biproduct ==
For any braided Hopf algebra R in ${}^H_H\mathcal{YD}$ there exists a natural Hopf algebra $R\# H$ which contains R as a subalgebra and H as a Hopf subalgebra. It is called Radford's biproduct, named after its discoverer, the Hopf algebraist David Radford. It was rediscovered by Shahn Majid, who called it bosonization.

As a vector space, $R\# H$ is just $R\otimes H$. The algebra structure of $R\# H$ is given by

$$(r\# h)(r'\#h')=r(h_{(1)}\cdot r')\#h_{(2)}h',$$

where $r,r'\in R, h,h'\in H$, $\Delta (h)=h_{(1)}\otimes h_{(2)}$ (Sweedler notation) is the coproduct of $h\in H$, and $\cdot :H\otimes R\to R$ is the left action of H on R. Further, the coproduct of $R\# H$ is determined by the formula

$$\Delta (r\#h)=(r^{(1)}\#r^{(2)}{}_{(-1)}h_{(1)})\otimes (r^{(2)}{}_{(0)}\#h_{(2)}), \quad r\in R,h\in H.$$

Here $\Delta _R(r)=r^{(1)}\otimes r^{(2)}$ denotes the coproduct of r in R, and $\delta (r^{(2)})=r^{(2)}{}_{(-1)}\otimes r^{(2)}{}_{(0)}$ is the left coaction of H on $r^{(2)}\in R.$
