= Shahn Majid =

British mathematician and physicist

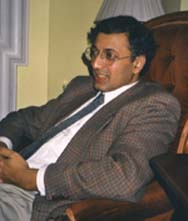
- Shahn Majid in 1998
- Born: 1 November 1960 (age 65); Patna, India
- Education: University of Cambridge; Harvard University
- Known for: Quantum groups, quantum spacetime, braided Hopf algebras, octonions
- Awards: Bleuler Medal
- Scientific career
- Fields: Physicist, mathematician
- Workplaces: Queen Mary, University of London
- Doctoral advisor: Clifford Taubes; Arthur Jaffe

Shahn Majid (born 1 November 1960) is an English pure mathematician and theoretical physicist, trained at Cambridge University and Harvard University and, since 2001, a professor of mathematics at the School of Mathematical Sciences, Queen Mary, University of London.

Majid is best known for his pioneering work on quantum groups where he introduced one of the two main known classes of these objects and worked on all aspects of their theory. His 1995 textbook Foundations of Quantum Group Theory is a standard text still used by researchers today. He also pioneered a quantum groups approach to noncommutative geometry and the use of such methods as a route to quantum gravity, leading in 1994 to the first model with testable predictions of quantum spacetime. He is also known for a range of results in algebra and category theory, notably for his theory of braided Hopf algebras and for a new view of the octonions. Although many regard Majid as a pure mathematician, his motivation and early training was in theoretical physics, and pure mathematics merely represents a path in his lifelong search for the 'true nature of physical reality'.

In 2008, he edited and co-authored an ambitious book of essays On Space and Time along with Alain Connes, Roger Penrose, John Polkinghorne, Michal Heller and Andrew Taylor, in which the authors aim to expose the frontier of scientific research on the small and large scale structure of the Universe to a general but scientifically interested audience.

== Education and career ==
He did his B.A. and Part III diploma at the University of Cambridge following the Mathematical Tripos and based at Emmanuel College, Cambridge. In 1983, he was awarded a Herschel Smith Scholarship, which took him to Harvard University. At Harvard, he was a tutor at Eliot House, while engaged in his PhD jointly between the physics and pure mathematics departments, under Arthur Jaffe and Clifford Taubes respectively. Armed with his PhD in 1988, his first job was as a 1-year postdoc at the University of Swansea, before moving on a Drapers Fellowship to Pembroke College, Cambridge, where he remained a Fellow until his move to Queen Mary in 1999. The 10 years of research based in Cambridge University, DAMTP included two years as a visiting scholar back at Harvard and a variety of research fellowships including a Royal Society University Research Fellowship. In 1993, he was awarded a one-time Konrad Bleuler Medal by an international conference. He has been visiting professor at the Perimeter Institute, Oxford University, and Cambridge University, as well as a principal organiser along with Alain Connes and Albert Schwarz of a 6-month programme on noncommutative geometry at the Isaac Newton Institute in 2006. In 2009, he was a Leverhulme Trust Senior Research Fellow.

== Scientific works ==
Majid wrote several early papers before his more established PhD work. These included work on gauge fields as Fourier transform on the space of loops on a manifold and their quantisation as noncommutative geometry, a novel 'infinite spin' limit for handling infinities in quantum field theory and an infinitesimal explanation of quark confinement.

His 1988 PhD thesis introduced a 'bicrossproduct' type of quantum group at a time when few such objects were known. Halfway through his PhD research Vladimir Drinfeld and Michio Jimbo found another and more popular class of these objects, but the bicrossproduct ones have had a resurgence of interest in recent years. Majid rapidly established himself as a leading authority on all types of quantum groups and developed a distinctive Hopf algebraic approach to them, including well-known results on the quantum double and a duality construction for a monoidal category. His 1998 lectures on the topic in the Mathematical Tripos of the University of Cambridge were published by the London Mathematical Society.

In the 1990s, Majid introduced the theory of braided groups or braided Hopf algebras as the true objects underlying $q$-deformations. He proved the main theorems in the field of 'transmutation' and 'bosonisation' and constructed the first and still main examples of the theory, including quantum planes as an additive braided groups. Other well-known work includes a picture of the octonions as associative in a certain symmetric monoidal category.

Also in the 1990s he pioneered the theory and first models of noncommutative or quantum spacetimes. The 1994 Majid-Ruegg model in particular turned out to be testable by data now being collected by the GLAST-Fermi gamma ray space telescope. Whether his model is confirmed or not, the most important thing, according to Majid, is that unlike much of modern theoretical physics, it is testable. Recent works include theorems pointing to a new field of nonassociative geometry, noncommutative gravity and (2+1)-dimensional quantum gravity.

== A philosophy of Relative Realism ==
"Nature does not necessarily use the maths already in maths books, hence theoretical physicists should be prepared to explore ... all of pure mathematics"

This quote from Majid's On Space and Time was presented as reply to physicists who attack mathematicians while turning to maths books for structures to use in their theories, as if mathematics is a resource rather than part of the creative process. The subtle interplay between the creativity of pure mathematics and the fact-driven agenda of physics form the basis of a general philosophy of Relative Realism in which Majid argues that the nature of physical reality is not fundamentally different from the way that topics in pure mathematics are on the one hand created by definitions and on the other hand 'out there' waiting to be invented. Majid gives the more everyday example of the way that the reality experienced in a game of chess is created by the rules of chess and the choice to abide by them while at the same time, on another level, the rules of chess were themselves a reality waiting to be discovered by those seeking to invent board games. The general picture leads to a dualism between experiment and theory or 'principle of representation-theoretic self-duality' in which Majid argues that 'the search for the ultimate theory of physics is the search for self-dual structures in a self-dual category'. Although not accepted by professional philosophers of science, the philosophy has provided a point of view behind most of his research work.

== Publications ==
Numerous research publications and review articles, and the following three books:

- Majid, S. (1995), Foundations of Quantum Group Theory, Cambridge University Press, ISBN 978-0-521-64868-4
- Majid, S. (2002), A quantum groups primer, London Mathematical Society Lecture Note Series, vol. 292, Cambridge University Press, Bibcode:2002qgp..book.....M, ISBN 978-0-521-01041-2
- S. Majid, ed. (2008), On Space and Time, Cambridge University Press, ISBN 978-0-521-88926-1
- Beggs, Edwin; Majid, Shahn (2020). Quantum Riemannian Geometry. Springer International Publishing. Bibcode:2020qrg..book.....B. doi:10.1007/978-3-030-30294-8. ISBN 978-3-030-30293-1. S2CID 214461866.
