= Giovanni Amelino-Camelia =

Italian physicist (born 1965)

Giovanni Amelino-Camelia (born 14 December 1965, Naples) is an Italian physicist of the University of Naples Federico II who works on quantum gravity.

He is the first proposer of doubly special relativity, that is the idea of introducing the Planck length in physics as an observer-independent quantity, obtaining a relativistic theory (like Galileian relativity and Einstein's special relativity). The principles of doubly special relativity probably imply the loss of the notion of classical (Riemannian) spacetime; this led Amelino-Camelia to the study of non-commutative geometry as a feasible theory of quantum spacetime. Amelino-Camelia is the initiator of "quantum-gravity phenomenology", for being the first to show that with some experiments under reach of current technology sensitivity to Planck-scale effects is feasible (see Fermi Gamma-ray Space Telescope).

== Biography ==
After graduating in physics from University of Naples Federico II in 1989, he received his Ph.D. from Boston University in 1993. He has held several postdoctoral positions abroad. From 2000 to 2018, he was a university researcher at the Sapienza University of Rome, where he taught “Introduction to Quantum Gravity.” Since 2018, he has been a researcher at the University of Naples Federico II”, where he teaches "General Relativity and Gravitation".

Quantum gravity is concerned with the study of physical regimes in which both the effects due to Quantum mechanics and those of General relativity are no longer negligible, and aims at the development of unitary theories of gravitational phenomena compatible with both. In this field, Amelino-Camelia is the proponent of doubly special relativity, a relativistic theory that stands as an evolution of Einstein's Special relativity and is based on the introduction of two relativistic invariants: the Planck units (minimum length scale) and the Planck energy (maximum energy scale). This approach was later developed by other authors, including Lee Smolin.

A second contribution by Amelino-Camelia is simplified models of quantum gravity that can be experimentally verified with currently available technologies, such as the NASA-sponsored Fermi Gamma-ray Space Telescope for observing gamma-ray bursts and cosmic gamma rays.

The h-index of his publications is among the highest among those of active Italian theoretical physicists.

In 2008, the U.S. magazine Discover (magazine) included him in its list of 6 possible new Albert Einstein capable of operating a new physics revolution.

He is a member of the Accademia Pontaniana of Naples and the Foundational Questions Institute founded by Max Tegmark.
