= Free algebra =

Free object in the category of associative algebras

In mathematics, especially in the area of abstract algebra known as ring theory, a free algebra is the noncommutative analogue of a polynomial ring since its elements may be described as "polynomials" with non-commuting variables. Likewise, the polynomial ring may be regarded as a free commutative algebra.

== Definition ==
For R a commutative ring, the free (associative, unital) algebra on n indeterminates {X_{1},...,X_{n}} is the free R-module with a basis consisting of all words over the alphabet {X_{1},...,X_{n}} (including the empty word, which is the unit of the free algebra). This R-module becomes an R-algebra by defining a multiplication as follows: the product of two basis elements is the concatenation of the corresponding words:

$$\left(X_{i_1}X_{i_2} \cdots X_{i_l}\right) \cdot \left(X_{j_1}X_{j_2} \cdots X_{j_m}\right) = X_{i_1}X_{i_2} \cdots X_{i_l}X_{j_1}X_{j_2} \cdots X_{j_m},$$

and the product of two arbitrary R-module elements is thus uniquely determined (because the multiplication in an R-algebra must be R-bilinear). This R-algebra is denoted R⟨X_{1},...,X_{n}⟩. This construction can easily be generalized to an arbitrary set X of indeterminates.

In short, for an arbitrary set $X=\{X_i\,;\; i\in I\}$, the free (associative, unital) R-algebra on X is

$$R\langle X\rangle:=\bigoplus_{w\in X^\ast}R w$$

with the R-bilinear multiplication that is concatenation on words, where X* denotes the free monoid on X (i.e. words on the letters X_{i}), $\oplus$ denotes the external direct sum, and Rw denotes the free R-module on 1 element, the word w.

For example, in R⟨X_{1},X_{2},X_{3},X_{4}⟩, for scalars α, β, γ, δ ∈ R, a concrete example of a product of two elements is

$$(\alpha X_1X_2^2 + \beta X_2X_3)\cdot(\gamma X_2X_1 + \delta X_1^4X_4) = \alpha\gamma X_1X_2^3X_1 + \alpha\delta X_1X_2^2X_1^4X_4 + \beta\gamma X_2X_3X_2X_1 + \beta\delta X_2X_3X_1^4X_4$$.

The non-commutative polynomial ring may be identified with the monoid ring over R of the free monoid of all finite words in the X_{i}.

== Contrast with polynomials ==
Since the words over the alphabet {X_{1}, ...,X_{n}} form a basis of R⟨X_{1},...,X_{n}⟩, it is clear that any element of R⟨X_{1}, ...,X_{n}⟩ can be written uniquely in the form:

$$\sum\limits_{k = 0}^\infty \, \, \, \sum\limits_{i_1,i_2, \cdots ,i_k\in\left\lbrace 1,2, \cdots ,n\right\rbrace} a_{i_1,i_2, \cdots ,i_k} X_{i_1} X_{i_2} \cdots X_{i_k},$$

where $a_{i_1,i_2,...,i_k}$ are elements of R and all but finitely many of these elements are zero. This explains why the elements of R⟨X_{1},...,X_{n}⟩ are often denoted as "non-commutative polynomials" in the "variables" (or "indeterminates") X_{1},...,X_{n}; the elements $a_{i_1,i_2,...,i_k}$ are said to be "coefficients" of these polynomials, and the R-algebra R⟨X_{1},...,X_{n}⟩ is called the "non-commutative polynomial algebra over R in n indeterminates". Note that unlike in an actual polynomial ring, the variables do not commute. For example, X_{1}X_{2} does not equal X_{2}X_{1}.

More generally, one can construct the free algebra R⟨E⟩ on any set E of generators. Since rings may be regarded as Z-algebras, a free ring on E can be defined as the free algebra Z⟨E⟩.

Over a field, the free algebra on n indeterminates can be constructed as the tensor algebra on an n-dimensional vector space. For a more general coefficient ring, the same construction works if we take the free module on n generators.

The construction of the free algebra on E is functorial in nature and satisfies an appropriate universal property. The free algebra functor is left adjoint to the forgetful functor from the category of R-algebras to the category of sets.

Free algebras over division rings are free ideal rings.

== See also ==
- Cofree coalgebra
- Tensor algebra
- Free object
- Noncommutative ring
- Rational series
- Term algebra
