= Cofree coalgebra =

In algebra, the cofree coalgebra of a vector space or module is a coalgebra analog of the free algebra of a vector space. The cofree coalgebra of any vector space over a field exists, though it is more complicated than one might expect by analogy with the free algebra.

== Definition ==
If V is a vector space over a field F, then the cofree coalgebra C (V), of V, is a coalgebra together with a linear map C (V) → V, such that any linear map from a coalgebra X to V factors through a coalgebra homomorphism from X to C (V). In other words, the functor C is right adjoint to the forgetful functor from coalgebras to vector spaces.

The cofree coalgebra of a vector space always exists, and is unique up to canonical isomorphism.

Cofree cocommutative coalgebras are defined in a similar way, and can be constructed as the largest cocommutative coalgebra in the cofree coalgebra.

== Construction ==
C (V) may be constructed as a completion of the tensor coalgebra T(V) of V. For k ∈ N = {0, 1, 2, ...}, let T^{k}V denote the k-fold tensor power of V:

$$T^kV = V^{\otimes k} = V\otimes V \otimes \cdots \otimes V,$$

with T^{0}V = F, and T^{1}V = V. Then T(V) is the direct sum of all T^{k}V:

$$T(V)= \bigoplus_{k \in \mathbb{N}} T^kV = \mathbb{F}\oplus V \oplus (V \otimes V) \oplus (V \otimes V \otimes V) \oplus \cdots.$$

In addition to the graded algebra structure given by the tensor product isomorphisms T^{j}V ⊗ T^{k}V → T^{j+k}V for j, k ∈ N, T(V) has a graded coalgebra structure Δ : T(V) → T(V) ⊠ T(V) defined by extending

$$\Delta(v_1 \otimes \dots \otimes v_k) := \sum_{j=0}^{k} (v_0 \otimes \dots \otimes v_j) \boxtimes (v_{j+1} \otimes \dots \otimes v_{k+1})$$

by linearity to all of T(V).

Here, the tensor product symbol ⊠ is used to indicate the tensor product used to define a coalgebra; it must not be confused with the tensor product ⊗, which is used to define the bilinear multiplication operator of the tensor algebra. The two act in different spaces, on different objects. Additional discussion of this point can be found in the tensor algebra article.

The sum above makes use of a short-hand trick, defining $v_0=v_{k+1}=1\in \mathbb{F}$ to be the unit in the field $\mathbb{F}$. For example, this short-hand trick gives, for the case of $k=1$ in the above sum, the result that

$$\Delta(v) = 1\boxtimes v + v \boxtimes 1$$

for $v \in V$. Similarly, for $k=2$ and $v,w \in V$, one gets

$$\Delta(v\otimes w) = 1\boxtimes (v\otimes w) + v \boxtimes w + (v\otimes w) \boxtimes 1.$$

Note that there is no need to ever write $1\otimes v$ as this is just plain-old scalar multiplication in the algebra; that is, one trivially has that $1\otimes v = 1\cdot v = v.$

With the usual product this coproduct does not make T(V) into a bialgebra, but is instead dual to the algebra structure on T(V^{∗}), where V^{∗} denotes the dual vector space of linear maps V → F. It can be turned into a bialgebra with the product $v_i\cdot v_j=(i,j)v_{i+j}$ where (i,j) denotes the binomial coefficient $\tbinom{i+j}{i}$. This bialgebra is known as the divided power Hopf algebra. The product is dual to the coalgebra structure on T(V^{∗}) which makes the tensor algebra a bialgebra.

Here an element of T(V) defines a linear form on T(V^{∗}) using the nondegenerate pairings

$$T^kV \times T^k V^* \to \mathbb{F}$$

induced by evaluation, and the duality between the coproduct on T(V) and the product on T(V^{∗}) means that

$$\Delta(f)(a\otimes b) = f(ab).$$

This duality extends to a nondegenerate pairing

$$\hat T(V) \times T(V^*) \to \mathbb{F},$$

where

$$\hat T(V) = \prod_{k\in\mathbb{N}} T^kV$$

is the direct product of the tensor powers of V. (The direct sum T(V) is the subspace of the direct product for which only finitely many components are nonzero.) However, the coproduct Δ on T(V) only extends to a linear map

$$\hat\Delta\colon \hat T(V) \to \hat T(V) \hat\otimes \hat T(V)$$

with values in the completed tensor product, which in this case is

$$\hat T(V) \hat\otimes \hat T(V) = \prod_{j,k\in\mathbb{N}} T^jV \otimes T^kV,$$

and contains the tensor product as a proper subspace:

$$\hat T(V) \otimes \hat T(V) = \{ X\in \hat T(V) \hat\otimes \hat T(V): \exists\, k\in \mathbb N, f_j, g_j \in \hat T(V) \text{ s.t. } X = {\textstyle\sum}_{j=0}^k (f_j \otimes g_j) \}.$$

The completed tensor coalgebra C (V) is the largest subspace C satisfying

$$T(V) \subseteq C \subseteq \hat T(V) \text{ and } \hat\Delta(C) \subseteq C\otimes C \subseteq \hat T(V) \hat\otimes \hat T(V),$$

which exists because if C_{1} and C_{2} satisfiy these conditions, then so does their sum C_{1} + C_{2}.

It turns out that C (V) is the subspace of all representative elements:

$$C(V) = \{ f\in \hat T(V): \hat \Delta(f) \in \hat T(V)\otimes \hat T(V)\}.$$

Furthermore, by the finiteness principle for coalgebras, any f ∈ C (V) must belong to a finite-dimensional subcoalgebra of C (V). Using the duality pairing with T(V^{∗}), it follows that f ∈ C (V) if and only if the kernel of f on T(V^{∗}) contains a two-sided ideal of finite codimension. Equivalently,

$$C(V) = \bigcup\{ I^0\subseteq \hat T(V): I\triangleleft T(V^*),\, \mathrm{codim}\, I <\infty\}$$

is the union of annihilators I ^{0} of finite codimension ideals I in T(V^{∗}), which are isomorphic to the duals of the finite-dimensional algebra quotients T(V^{∗})/I.

=== Example ===
When V = F, T(V^{∗}) is the polynomial algebra F[t] in one variable t, and the direct product

$$\hat T(V) = \prod_{k\in\mathbb{N}} T^kV$$

may be identified with the vector space F[[τ]] of formal power series

$$\sum_{j\in \N} a_j \tau^j$$

in an indeterminate τ. The coproduct Δ on the subspace F[τ] is determined by

$$\Delta(\tau^k)=\sum_{i+j=k} \tau^i\otimes \tau^j$$

and C (V) is the largest subspace of F[[τ]] on which this extends to a coalgebra structure.

The duality F[[τ]] × F[t] → F is determined by τ^{j}(t^{k}) = δ_{jk} so that

$$\biggl(\sum_{j\in \N} a_j \tau^j\biggr)\biggl(\sum_{k=0}^N b_k t^k\biggr) = \sum_{k=0}^N a_k b_k.$$

Putting t=τ^{−1}, this is the constant term in the product of two formal Laurent series. Thus, given a polynomial p(t) with leading term t^{N}, the formal Laurent series

$$\frac{\tau^{j-N}}{p(\tau^{-1})}=\frac{\tau^j}{\tau^N p(\tau^{-1})}$$

is a formal power series for any j ∈ N, and annihilates the ideal I(p) generated by p for j < N. Since F[t]/I(p) has dimension N, these formal power series span the annihilator of I(p). Furthermore, they all belong to the localization of F[τ] at the ideal generated by τ, i.e., they have the form f(τ)/g(τ) where f and g are polynomials, and g has nonzero constant term. This is the space of rational functions in τ which are regular at zero. Conversely, any proper rational function annihilates an ideal of the form I(p).

Any nonzero ideal of F[t] is principal, with finite-dimensional quotient. Thus C (V) is the sum of the annihilators of the principal ideals I(p), i.e., the space of rational functions regular at zero.
