= Braided vector space =

In mathematics, a braided vector space $V$ is a vector space together with an additional structure map $\tau$ symbolizing interchanging of two tensor products:

$$\tau: V \otimes V \to V \otimes V$$,

such that the Yang–Baxter equation is fulfilled. Hence, drawing tensor diagrams with $\tau$ an overcrossing, the corresponding composed morphism is unchanged when a Reidemeister move is applied to the tensor diagram. Thus, they are a representation of the braid group.

As a first example, any vector space can be turned into a braided vector space by equipping it with the trivial braiding (i.e. the one mapping $x\otimes y$ to $y\otimes x$). A superspace has a braiding with negative sign in braiding two odd vectors. More generally, a diagonal braiding means that for a basis $\{x_i\}_{i\in I}$ we have

$$\tau(x_i\otimes x_j) = q_{ij}(x_j\otimes x_i)$$.

A good source for braided vector spaces entire braided monoidal categories with braidings between any objects $\tau_{V,W}$, most importantly the modules over quasitriangular Hopf algebras and Yetter–Drinfeld modules over finite groups (such as $\mathbb{Z}_2$ above)

If $V$ additionally possesses an algebra structure inside the braided category ("braided algebra") one has a braided commutator (e.g. for a superspace the anticommutator):

$$\;[x,y]_\tau:=\mu((x\otimes y)-\tau(x\otimes y)),\qquad \mu(x\otimes y):=xy$$.

Examples of such braided algebras (and even Hopf algebras) are the Nichols algebras, that are by definition generated by a given braided vector space. They appear as quantum Borel parts of quantum groups and often (e.g. when finite or over an abelian group) possess an arithmetic root system, multiple Dynkin diagrams and a PBW-basis made up of braided commutators just like the ones in semisimple Lie algebras.
