= Yetter–Drinfeld category =

In mathematics a Yetter–Drinfeld category is a special type of braided monoidal category. It consists of modules over a Hopf algebra which satisfy some additional axioms.

== Definition ==
Let H be a Hopf algebra over a field k. Let $\Delta$ denote the coproduct and S the antipode of H. Let V be a vector space over k. Then V is called a (left left) Yetter–Drinfeld module over H if

- $(V,\boldsymbol{.})$ is a left H-module, where $\boldsymbol{.}: H\otimes V\to V$ denotes the left action of H on V,
- $(V,\delta\;)$ is a left H-comodule, where $\delta : V\to H\otimes V$ denotes the left coaction of H on V,
- the maps $\boldsymbol{.}$ and $\delta$ satisfy the compatibility condition

$\delta (h\boldsymbol{.}v)=h_{(1)}v_{(-1)}S(h_{(3)}) \otimes h_{(2)}\boldsymbol{.}v_{(0)}$ for all $h\in H,v\in V$,

where, using Sweedler notation, $(\Delta \otimes \mathrm{id})\Delta (h)=h_{(1)}\otimes h_{(2)} \otimes h_{(3)} \in H\otimes H\otimes H$ denotes the twofold coproduct of $h\in H$, and $\delta (v)=v_{(-1)}\otimes v_{(0)}$.

== Examples ==
- Any left H-module over a cocommutative Hopf algebra H is a Yetter–Drinfeld module with the trivial left coaction $\delta (v)=1\otimes v$.
- The trivial module $V=k\{v\}$ with $h\boldsymbol{.}v=\epsilon (h)v$, $\delta (v)=1\otimes v$, is a Yetter–Drinfeld module for all Hopf algebras H.
- If H is the group algebra kG of an abelian group G, then Yetter–Drinfeld modules over H are precisely the G-graded G-modules. This means that

$$V=\bigoplus _{g\in G}V_g$$,

where each $V_g$ is a G-submodule of V.

- More generally, if the group G is not abelian, then Yetter–Drinfeld modules over H=kG are G-modules with a G-gradation

$V=\bigoplus _{g\in G}V_g$, such that $g.V_h\subset V_{ghg^{-1}}$.

- Over the base field $k=\mathbb{C}\;$ all finite-dimensional, irreducible/simple Yetter–Drinfeld modules over a (nonabelian) group H=kG are uniquely given through a conjugacy class $[g]\subset G\;$ together with $\chi,X\;$ (character of) an irreducible group representation of the centralizer $Cent(g)\;$ of some representing $g\in[g]$:
  $$V=\mathcal{O}_{[g]}^\chi=\mathcal{O}_{[g]}^{X}\qquad V=\bigoplus_{h\in[g]}V_{h}=\bigoplus_{h\in[g]}X$$
  - As G-module take $\mathcal{O}_{[g]}^\chi$ to be the induced module of $\chi,X\;$:
  $$Ind_{Cent(g)}^G(\chi)=kG\otimes_{kCent(g)}X$$
  (this can be proven easily not to depend on the choice of g)
  - To define the G-graduation (comodule) assign any element $t\otimes v\in kG\otimes_{kCent(g)}X=V$ to the graduation layer:
  $$t\otimes v\in V_{tgt^{-1}}$$
  - It is very custom to directly construct $V\;$ as direct sum of X´s and write down the G-action by choice of a specific set of representatives $t_i\;$ for the $Cent(g)\;$-cosets. From this approach, one often writes
  $$h\otimes v\subset[g]\times X \;\; \leftrightarrow \;\; t_i\otimes v\in kG\otimes_{kCent(g)}X \qquad\text{with uniquely}\;\;h=t_igt_i^{-1}$$
  (this notation emphasizes the graduation $h\otimes v\in V_h$, rather than the module structure)

== Braiding ==
Let H be a Hopf algebra with invertible antipode S, and let V, W be Yetter–Drinfeld modules over H. Then the map $c_{V,W}:V\otimes W\to W\otimes V$,

$$c(v\otimes w):=v_{(-1)}\boldsymbol{.}w\otimes v_{(0)},$$

is invertible with inverse

$$c_{V,W}^{-1}(w\otimes v):=v_{(0)}\otimes S^{-1}(v_{(-1)})\boldsymbol{.}w.$$

Further, for any three Yetter–Drinfeld modules U, V, W the map c satisfies the braid relation

$$(c_{V,W}\otimes \mathrm{id}_U)(\mathrm{id}_V\otimes c_{U,W})(c_{U,V}\otimes \mathrm{id}_W)=(\mathrm{id}_W\otimes c_{U,V}) (c_{U,W}\otimes \mathrm{id}_V) (\mathrm{id}_U\otimes c_{V,W}):U\otimes V\otimes W\to W\otimes V\otimes U.$$

A monoidal category $\mathcal{C}$ consisting of Yetter–Drinfeld modules over a Hopf algebra H with bijective antipode is called a Yetter–Drinfeld category. It is a braided monoidal category with the braiding c above. The category of Yetter–Drinfeld modules over a Hopf algebra H with bijective antipode is denoted by ${}^H_H\mathcal{YD}$.
