= Timeline of quantum mechanics =

The timeline of quantum mechanics is a list of key events in the history of quantum mechanics, quantum field theories and quantum chemistry.

The initiation of quantum science occurred in 1900, originating from the problem of the oscillator beginning during the mid-19th century.

== 19th century ==
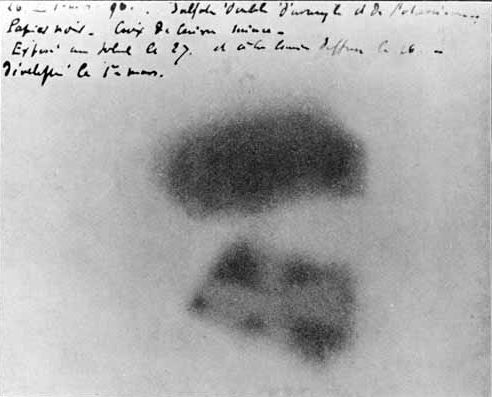
Image of Becquerel's photographic plate that has been fogged by exposure to radiation from a uranium salt. The shadow of a metal Maltese Cross placed between the plate and the uranium salt is clearly visible.

- 1801 – Thomas Young establishes the wave nature of light with his double-slit experiment. (Note: "The development of quantum mechanics was preceded by that of the quantum theory of light. At the end of the last century it seemed that in the contest between the corpuscular and wave theories of the nature of light the wave theory had finally triumphed in the form due to Maxwell.")
- 1859 – Gustav Kirchhoff introduces the concept of a blackbody and proves that its emission spectrum depends only on its temperature.
- 1860–1900 – Ludwig Eduard Boltzmann, James Clerk Maxwell and others develop the theory of statistical mechanics. Boltzmann argues that entropy is a measure of disorder.
- 1877 – Boltzmann suggests that the energy levels of a physical system could be discrete based on statistical mechanics and mathematical arguments; also produces the first circle diagram representation, or atomic model of a molecule (such as an iodine gas molecule) in terms of the overlapping terms α and β, later (in 1928) called molecular orbitals, of the constituting atoms.
- 1885 – Johann Jakob Balmer discovers a numerical relationship between visible spectral lines of hydrogen, the Balmer series.
- 1887 – Heinrich Hertz discovers the photoelectric effect, shown by Einstein in 1905 to involve quanta of light.
- 1888 – Hertz demonstrates experimentally that electromagnetic waves exist, as predicted by Maxwell.
- 1888 – Johannes Rydberg modifies the Balmer formula to include all spectral series of lines for the hydrogen atom, producing the Rydberg formula that is employed later by Niels Bohr and others to verify Bohr's first quantum model of the atom.
- 1895 – Wilhelm Conrad Röntgen discovers X-rays in experiments with electron beams in plasma.
- 1896 – Antoine Henri Becquerel accidentally discovers radioactivity while investigating the work of Wilhelm Conrad Röntgen; he finds that uranium salts emit radiation that resembled Röntgen's X-rays in their penetrating power. In one experiment, Becquerel wraps a sample of a phosphorescent substance, potassium uranyl sulfate, in photographic plates surrounded by very thick black paper in preparation for an experiment with bright sunlight; then, to his surprise, the photographic plates are already exposed before the experiment starts, showing a projected image of his sample.
- 1896–1897 – Pieter Zeeman first observes the Zeeman splitting effect by applying a magnetic field to light sources.
- 1896–1897 – Marie Curie (née Skłodowska, Becquerel's doctoral student) investigates uranium salt samples using a very sensitive electrometer device that was invented 15 years before by her husband and his brother Jacques Curie to measure electrical charge. She discovers that rays emitted by the uranium salt samples make the surrounding air electrically conductive, and measures the emitted rays' intensity. In April 1898, through a systematic search of substances, she finds that thorium compounds, like those of uranium, emitted "Becquerel rays", thus preceding the work of Frederick Soddy and Ernest Rutherford on the nuclear decay of thorium to radium by three years.
- 1897:
  - Ivan Borgman demonstrates that X-rays and radioactive materials induce thermoluminescence.
  - J. J. Thomson's experimentation with cathode rays led him to suggest a fundamental unit more than a 1,000 times smaller than an atom, based on the high charge-to-mass ratio. He called the particle a "corpuscle", but later scientists preferred the term electron.
  - Joseph Larmor explained the splitting of the spectral lines in a magnetic field by the oscillation of electrons.
  - Larmor, created the first solar system model of the atom in 1897. He also postulated the proton, calling it a "positive electron". He said the destruction of this type of atom making up matter "is an occurrence of infinitely small probability".
- 1899–1903 – Ernest Rutherford investigates radioactivity. He coins the terms alpha and beta rays in 1899 to describe the two distinct types of radiation emitted by thorium and uranium salts. Rutherford is joined at McGill University in 1900 by Frederick Soddy and together they discover nuclear transmutation when they find in 1902 that radioactive thorium is converting itself into radium through a process of nuclear decay and a gas (later found to be ^{4}_{2}He); they report their interpretation of radioactivity in 1903. Rutherford becomes known as the "father of nuclear physics" with his nuclear atom model of 1911.

== 20th century ==
=== 1900–1909 ===
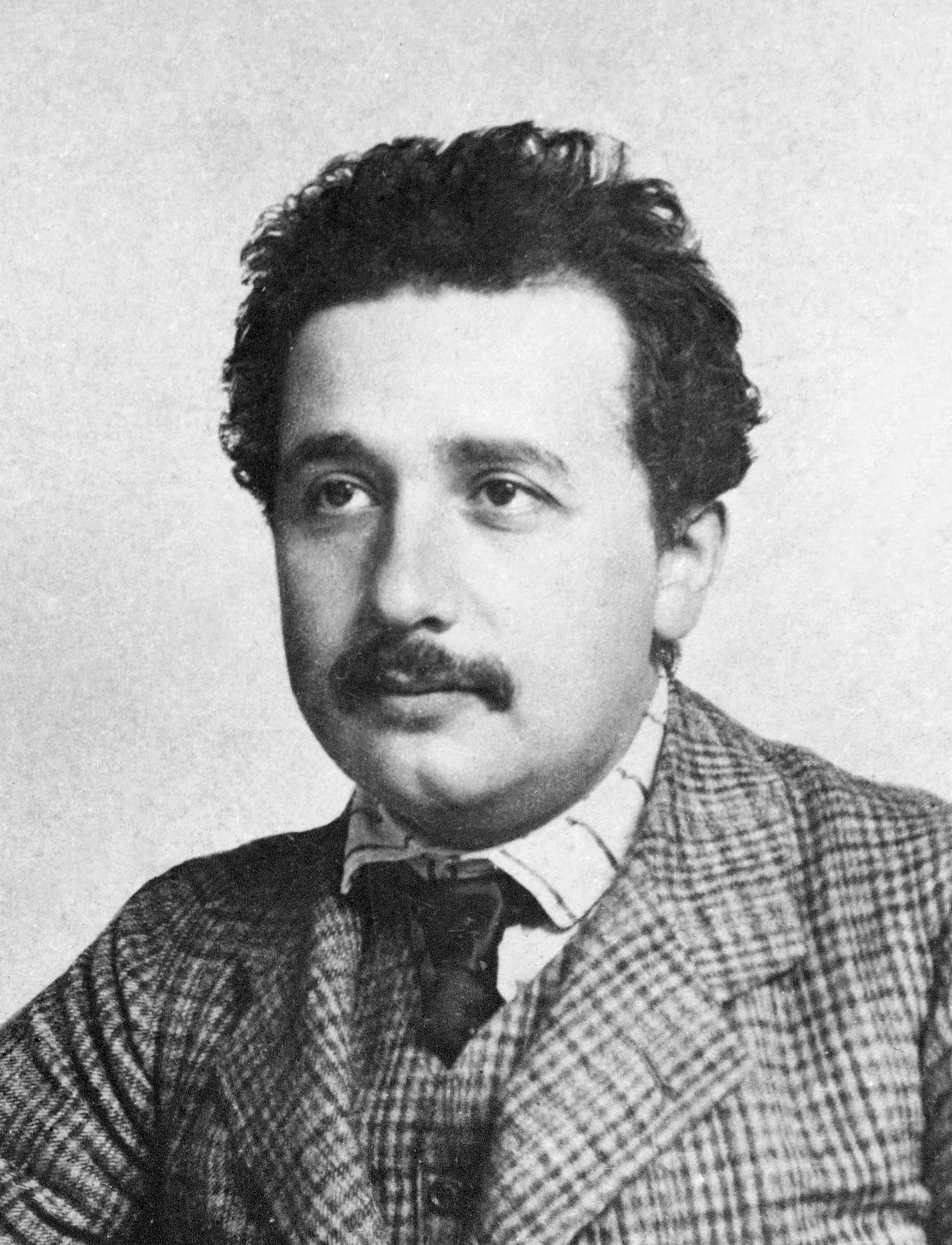
Einstein, in 1905, when he wrote the Annus Mirabilis papers

- 1900 – To explain black-body radiation (1862), Max Planck suggests that electromagnetic energy could only be emitted in quantized form, i.e. the energy could only be a multiple of an elementary unit $E = h \nu$, where $h$ is the Planck constant and $\nu$ (the Greek letter nu) is the frequency of the radiation.
- 1902 – To explain the octet rule (1893), Gilbert N. Lewis develops the "cubical atom" theory in which electrons in the form of dots are positioned at the corner of a cube. Predicts that single, double, or triple "bonds" result when two atoms are held together by multiple pairs of electrons (one pair for each bond) located between the two atoms.
- 1903 – Antoine Becquerel, Pierre Curie and Marie Curie share the 1903 Nobel Prize in Physics for their work on spontaneous radioactivity.
- 1904 – Richard Abegg notes the pattern that the numerical difference between the maximum positive valence, such as +6 for H_{2}SO_{4}, and the maximum negative valence, such as −2 for H_{2}S, of an element tends to be eight (Abegg's rule).
- 1905 :
  - Albert Einstein explains the photoelectric effect (reported in 1887 by Heinrich Hertz), i.e. that shining light on certain materials can function to eject electrons from the material. He postulates, as based on Planck's quantum hypothesis (1900), that light itself consists of individual quantum particles (photons).
  - Einstein explains the effects of Brownian motion as caused by the kinetic energy (i.e., movement) of atoms, which was subsequently, experimentally verified by Jean Baptiste Perrin, thereby settling the century-long dispute about the validity of John Dalton's atomic theory.
  - Einstein publishes his special theory of relativity
  - Einstein theoretically derives the equivalence of matter and energy.
- 1907 to 1917 – Ernest Rutherford: To test his planetary model of 1904, later known as the Rutherford model, he sent a beam of positively charged alpha particles onto a gold foil and noticed that some bounced back, thus showing that an atom has a small-sized positively charged atomic nucleus at its center. However, he received in 1908 the Nobel Prize in Chemistry "for his investigations into the disintegration of the elements, and the chemistry of radioactive substances", which followed on the work of Marie Curie, not for his planetary model of the atom; he is also widely credited with first "splitting the atom" in 1917. In 1911 Ernest Rutherford explained the Geiger–Marsden experiment by invoking a nuclear atom model and derived the Rutherford cross section.
- 1909 – Geoffrey Ingram Taylor demonstrates that interference patterns of light were generated even when the light energy introduced consisted of only one photon. This discovery of the wave–particle duality of matter and energy is fundamental to the later development of quantum field theory.
- 1909 and 1916 – Einstein shows that, if Planck's law of black-body radiation is accepted, the energy quanta must also carry momentum $p = h / \lambda$, making them full-fledged particles.

=== 1910–1919 ===
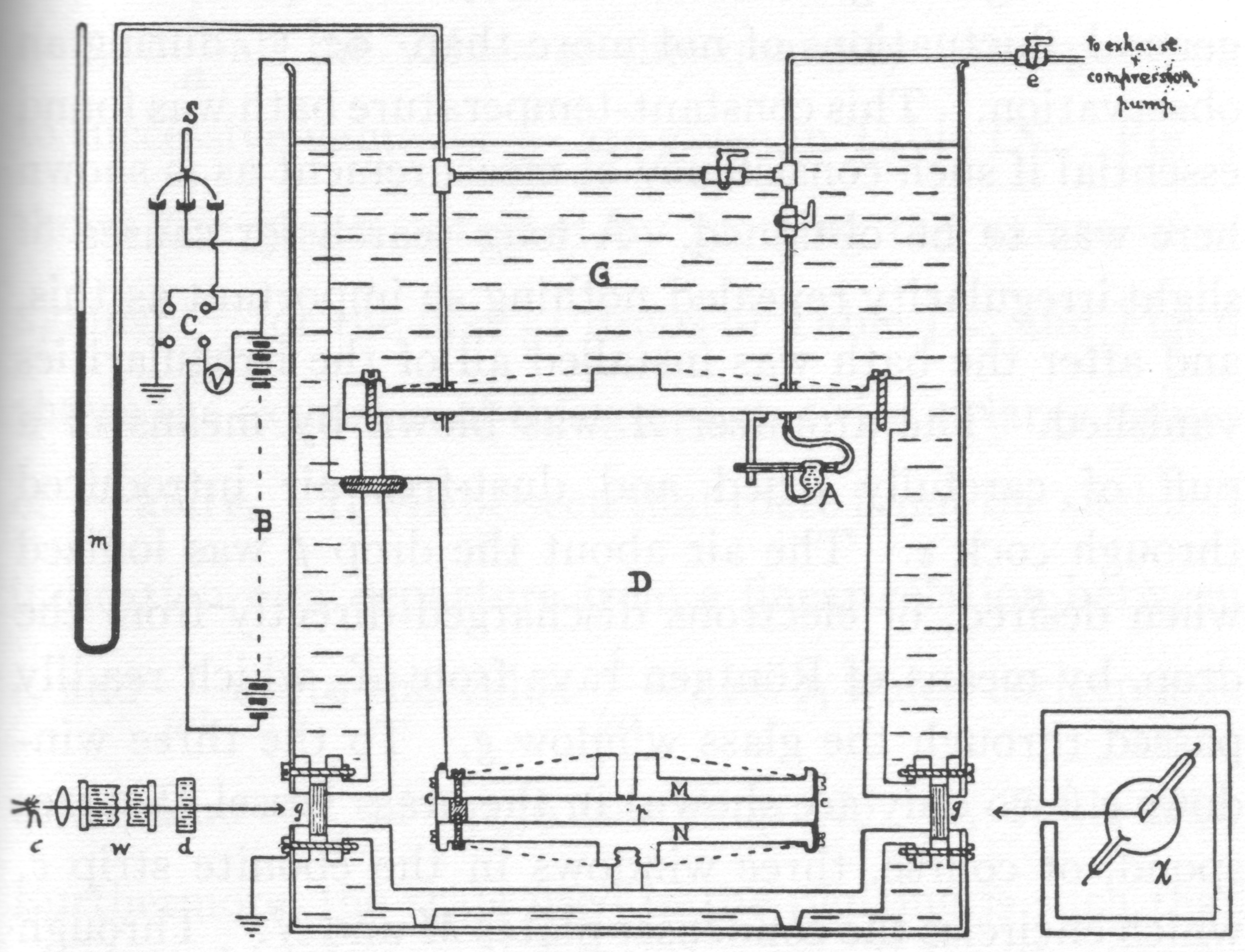
A schematic diagram of the apparatus for Millikan's refined oil drop experiment

- 1911:
  - Lise Meitner and Otto Hahn perform an experiment that shows that the energies of electrons emitted by beta decay had a continuous rather than discrete spectrum. This is in apparent contradiction to the law of conservation of energy, as it appeared that energy was lost in the beta decay process. A second problem is that the spin of the nitrogen-14 atom was 1, in contradiction to the Rutherford prediction of ½. These anomalies are later explained by the discoveries of the neutrino and the neutron.
  - Ștefan Procopiu performs experiments in which he determines the correct value of electron's magnetic dipole moment, μ_{B} = 9.27×10^{−21} erg·Oe^{−1} (in 1913 he is also able to calculate a theoretical value of the Bohr magneton based on Planck's quantum theory).
  - John William Nicholson is noted as the first to create an atomic model that quantized angular momentum as h/2π. Niels Bohr quoted him in his 1913 paper of the Bohr model of the atom.
- 1912 – Victor Hess discovers the existence of cosmic radiation.
- 1912 – Henri Poincaré publishes an influential mathematical argument in support of the essential nature of energy quanta.
- 1913:
  - Robert Andrews Millikan publishes the results of his oil drop experiment, in which he precisely determines the electric charge of the electron, and therefrom the Avogadro constant (which is the number of atoms or molecules in one mole of any substance).
  - Niels Bohr publishes his 1913 paper of the Bohr model of the atom.
  - Ștefan Procopiu publishes a theoretical paper with the correct value of the electron's magnetic dipole moment $\mu_B$.
  - Niels Bohr obtains theoretically the value of the electron's magnetic dipole moment $\mu_B$ as a consequence of his atom model
  - Johannes Stark and Antonino Lo Surdo independently discover the shifting and splitting of the spectral lines of atoms and molecules due to the presence of the light source in an external static electric field.
  - To explain the Rydberg formula (1888), which correctly modeled the light emission spectra of atomic hydrogen, Bohr hypothesizes that negatively charged electrons revolve around a positively charged nucleus at certain fixed "quantum" distances and that each of these "spherical orbits" has a specific energy associated with it such that electron movements between orbits requires "quantum" emissions or absorptions of energy.
- 1914 – James Franck and Gustav Hertz report their experiment on electron collisions with mercury atoms, which provides a new test of Bohr's quantized model of atomic energy levels.
- 1916 – Robert Milikan reports his measurement of the Planck constant and verification of Einstein's formula for the photoelectric effect.
- 1916 – Paul Epstein and Karl Schwarzschild, working independently, derive equations for the linear and quadratic Stark effect in hydrogen.
- 1916 – Gilbert N. Lewis conceives the theoretical basis of Lewis dot formulas, diagrams that show the bonding between atoms of a molecule and the lone pairs of electrons that may exist in the molecule.
- 1916 – To account for the Zeeman effect (1896), i.e. that atomic absorption or emission spectral lines change when the light source is subjected to a magnetic field, Arnold Sommerfeld suggests there might be "elliptical orbits" in atoms in addition to spherical orbits.
- 1918 – Sir Ernest Rutherford notices that, when alpha particles are shot into nitrogen gas, his scintillation detectors shows the signatures of hydrogen nuclei. Rutherford determines that the only place this hydrogen could have come from was the nitrogen, and therefore nitrogen must contain hydrogen nuclei. He thus suggests that the hydrogen nucleus, which is known to have an atomic number of 1, is an elementary particle, which he decides must be the protons hypothesized by Eugen Goldstein.
- 1919 – Building on the work of Lewis (1916), Irving Langmuir coins the term "covalence" and postulates that coordinate covalent bonds occur when two electrons of a pair of atoms come from both atoms and are equally shared by them, thus explaining the fundamental nature of chemical bonding and molecular chemistry.

=== 1920–1929 ===
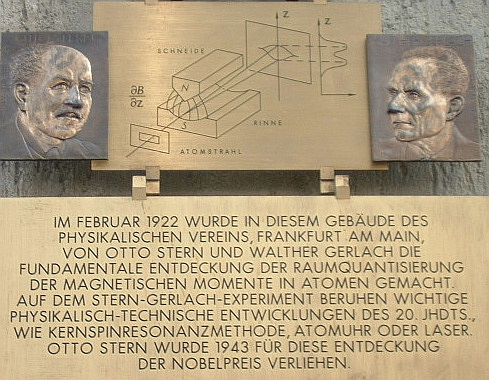
A plaque at the University of Frankfurt commemorating the Stern–Gerlach experiment

- 1920 – Hendrik Kramers uses Bohr–Sommerfeld quantization to derive formulas for intensities of spectral transitions of the Stark effect. Kramers also includes the effect of fine structure, including corrections for relativistic kinetic energy and coupling between electron spin and orbit.
- 1921–1922 – Frederick Soddy receives the Nobel Prize for 1921 in Chemistry one year later, in 1922, "for his contributions to our knowledge of the chemistry of radioactive substances, and his investigations into the origin and nature of isotopes"; he writes in his Nobel Lecture of 1922: "The interpretation of radioactivity which was published in 1903 by Sir Ernest Rutherford and myself ascribed the phenomena to the spontaneous disintegration of the atoms of the radio-element, whereby a part of the original atom was violently ejected as a radiant particle, and the remainder formed a totally new kind of atom with a distinct chemical and physical character."
- 1922:
  - Arthur Compton finds that X-ray wavelengths increase due to scattering of the radiant energy by free electrons. The scattered quanta have less energy than the quanta of the original ray. This discovery, known as the Compton effect or Compton scattering, demonstrates the particle concept of electromagnetic radiation.
  - Otto Stern and Walther Gerlach perform the Stern–Gerlach experiment, which detects discrete values of angular momentum for atoms in the ground state passing through an inhomogeneous magnetic field leading to the discovery of the spin of the electron.
  - Bohr updates his model of the atom to better explain the properties of the periodic table by assuming that certain numbers of electrons (for example 2, 8 and 18) corresponded to stable "closed shells", presaging orbital theory.
- 1923:
  - Pierre Auger discovers the Auger effect, where filling the inner-shell vacancy of an atom is accompanied by the emission of an electron from the same atom.
  - Louis de Broglie extends wave–particle duality to particles, postulating that electrons in motion are associated with waves. He predicts that the wavelengths are given by the Planck constant h divided by the momentum of the mv = p of the electron: λ = h / mv = h / p.
  - Gilbert N. Lewis creates the theory of Lewis acids and bases based on the properties of electrons in molecules, defining an acid as accepting an electron lone pair from a base.
- 1924 – Satyendra Nath Bose explains Planck's law using a new statistical law that governs bosons, and Einstein generalizes it to predict Bose–Einstein condensate. The theory becomes known as Bose–Einstein statistics.
- 1924 – Wolfgang Pauli outlines the "Pauli exclusion principle", which states that no two identical fermions may occupy the same quantum state simultaneously, a fact that explains many features of the periodic table.
- 1925:
  - George Uhlenbeck and Samuel Goudsmit postulate the existence of electron spin.
  - Friedrich Hund outlines Hund's rule of Maximum Multiplicity, which states that when electrons are added successively to an atom as many levels or orbits are singly occupied as possible before any pairing of electrons with opposite spin occurs and made the distinction that the inner electrons in molecules remained in atomic orbitals and only the valence electrons needed to be in molecular orbitals involving both nuclei.
  - Werner Heisenberg published his Umdeutung paper, reinterpreting quantum mechanics using non-commutative algebra.
  - Heisenberg, Max Born, and Pascual Jordan develop the matrix mechanics formulation of quantum Mechanics.
- 1926:
  - Lewis coins the term photon in a letter to the scientific journal Nature, which he derives from the Greek word for light, φως (transliterated phôs).
  - Oskar Klein and Walter Gordon state their relativistic quantum wave equation, later called the Klein–Gordon equation.
  - Enrico Fermi discovers the spin–statistics theorem connection.
  - Paul Dirac introduces Fermi–Dirac statistics.
  - Erwin Schrödinger uses De Broglie's electron wave postulate (1924) to develop a "wave equation" that represents mathematically the distribution of a charge of an electron distributed through space, being spherically symmetric or prominent in certain directions, i.e. directed valence bonds, which gives the correct values for spectral lines of the hydrogen atom; also introduces the Hamiltonian operator in quantum mechanics.
  - Max Born postulates the statistical interpretation of the quantum mechanical wave function (Born rule)
  - Paul Epstein reconsiders the linear and quadratic Stark effect from the point of view of the new quantum theory, using the equations of Schrödinger and others. The derived equations for the line intensities are a decided improvement over previous results obtained by Hans Kramers.
- 1926 to 1932 – John von Neumann published the Mathematical Foundations of Quantum Mechanics in terms of Hermitian operators on Hilbert spaces, subsequently published in 1932 as a basic textbook on the mathematical formulation of quantum mechanics.
- 1927:
  - Werner Heisenberg formulates the quantum uncertainty principle.
  - Niels Bohr and Werner Heisenberg develop the Copenhagen interpretation of the probabilistic nature of wavefunctions.
  - Born and J. Robert Oppenheimer introduce the Born–Oppenheimer approximation, which allows the quick approximation of the energy and wavefunctions of smaller molecules.
  - Walter Heitler and Fritz London introduce the concepts of valence bond theory and apply it to the hydrogen molecule.
  - Llewellyn Thomas and Fermi develop the Thomas–Fermi model for a gas in a box.
  - Chandrasekhara Venkata Raman studies optical photon scattering by electrons.
  - Dirac states his relativistic electron quantum wave equation, the Dirac equation.
  - Charles Galton Darwin and Walter Gordon solve the Dirac equation for a Coulomb potential.
  - Charles Drummond Ellis (along with James Chadwick and colleagues) finally establish clearly that the beta decay spectrum is in fact continuous and not discrete, posing a problem that will later be solved by theorizing (and later discovering) the existence of the neutrino.
  - Walter Heitler uses Schrödinger's wave equation to show how two hydrogen atom wavefunctions join, with plus, minus, and exchange terms, to form a covalent bond.
  - Robert Mulliken works, in coordination with Hund, to develop a molecular orbital theory where electrons are assigned to states that extend over an entire molecule and, in 1932, introduces many new molecular orbital terminologies, such as σ bond, π bond, and δ bond.
  - Eugene Wigner relates degeneracies of quantum states to irreducible representations of symmetry groups.
  - Hermann Klaus Hugo Weyl proves in collaboration with his student Fritz Peter a fundamental theorem in harmonic analysis—the Peter–Weyl theorem—relevant to group representations in quantum theory (including the complete reducibility of unitary representations of a compact topological group); introduces the Weyl quantization, and earlier, in 1918, introduces the concept of gauge and a gauge theory; later in 1935 he introduces and characterizes with Richard Bauer the concept of spinor in n dimensions.
- 1928:
  - Linus Pauling outlines the nature of the chemical bond: uses Heitler's quantum mechanical covalent bond model to outline the quantum mechanical basis for all types of molecular structure and bonding and suggests that different types of bonds in molecules can become equalized by rapid shifting of electrons, a process called "resonance" (1931), such that resonance hybrids contain contributions from the different possible electronic configurations.
  - Friedrich Hund and Robert S. Mulliken introduce the concept of molecular orbitals.
  - Born and Vladimir Fock formulate and prove the adiabatic theorem, which states that a physical system shall remain in its instantaneous eigenstate if a given perturbation is acting on it slowly enough and if there is a gap between the eigenvalue and the rest of the Hamiltonian's spectrum.
- 1929:
  - Oskar Klein discovers the Klein paradox
  - Oskar Klein and Yoshio Nishina derive the Klein–Nishina cross section for high energy photon scattering by electrons.
  - Sir Nevill Mott derives the Mott cross section for the Coulomb scattering of relativistic electrons.
  - John Lennard-Jones introduces the linear combination of atomic orbitals approximation for the calculation of molecular orbitals.
  - Fritz Houtermans and Robert d'Escourt Atkinson propose that stars release energy by nuclear fusion.

=== 1930–1939 ===
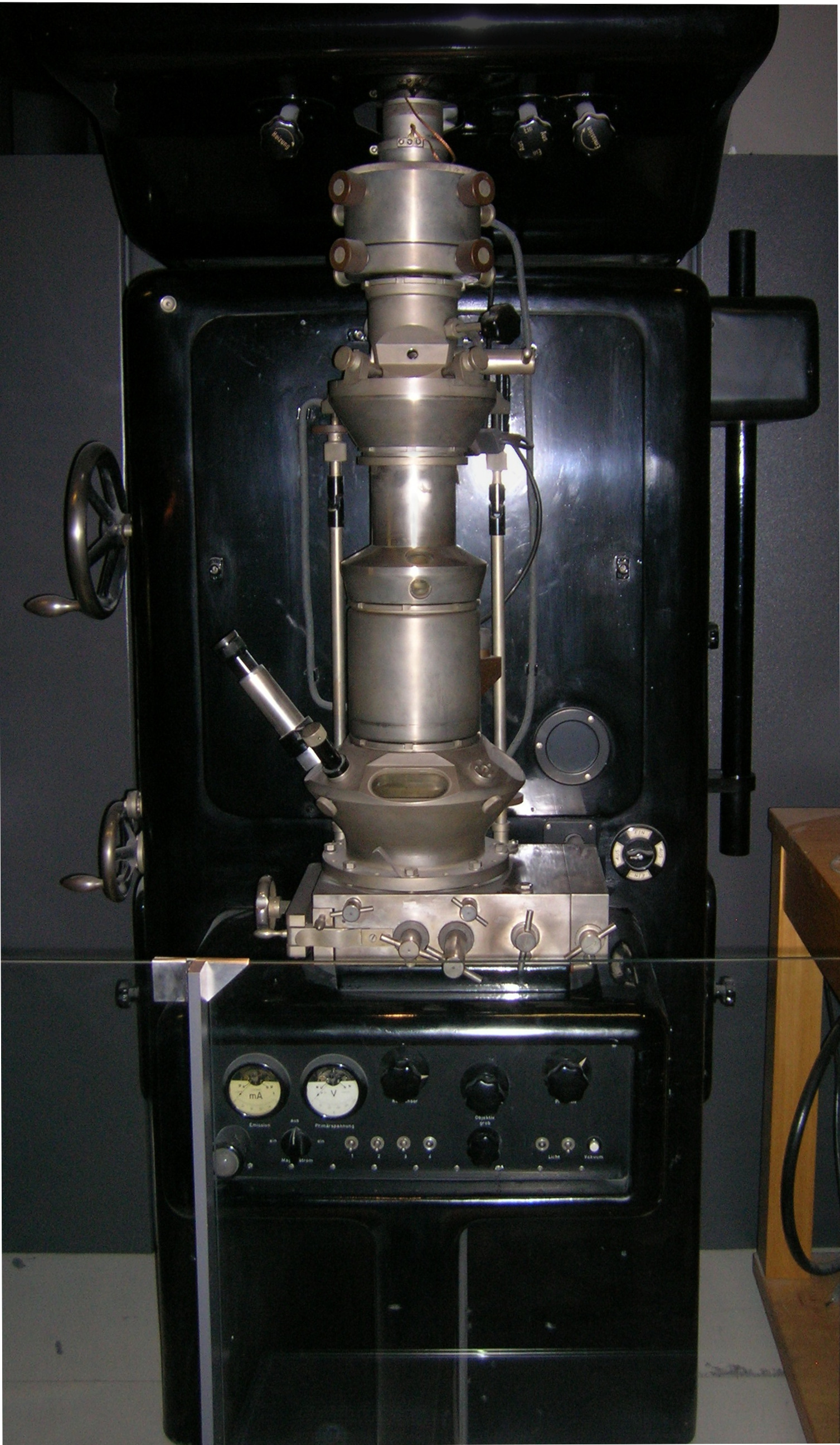
Electron microscope constructed by Ernst Ruska in 1933

- 1930
  - Dirac hypothesizes the existence of the positron.
  - Dirac's textbook The Principles of Quantum Mechanics is published, becoming a standard reference book that is still used today.
  - Erich Hückel introduces the Hückel molecular orbital method, which expands on orbital theory to determine the energies of orbitals of pi electrons in conjugated hydrocarbon systems.
  - Fritz London explains van der Waals forces as due to the interacting fluctuating dipole moments between molecules
  - Pauli suggests in a famous letter that, in addition to electrons and protons, atoms also contain an extremely light neutral particle that he calls the "neutron". He suggests that this "neutron" is also emitted during beta decay and has simply not yet been observed. Later it is determined that this particle is actually the almost massless neutrino.
- 1931:
  - John Lennard-Jones proposes the Lennard-Jones inter-atomic potential.
  - Walther Bothe and Herbert Becker find that if the very energetic alpha particles emitted from polonium fall on certain light elements, specifically beryllium, boron, or lithium, an unusually penetrating radiation is produced. At first this radiation is thought to be gamma radiation, although it is more penetrating than any gamma rays known, and the details of experimental results are very difficult to interpret on this basis. Some scientists begin to hypothesize the possible existence of another fundamental particle.
  - Erich Hückel redefines the property of aromaticity in a quantum mechanical context by introducing the 4n+2 rule, or Hückel's rule, which predicts whether an organic planar ring molecule will have aromatic properties.
  - Ernst Ruska creates the first electron microscope.
  - Ernest Lawrence creates the first cyclotron and founds the Radiation Laboratory, later the Lawrence Berkeley National Laboratory; in 1939 he was awarded the Nobel Prize in Physics for his work on the cyclotron.
- 1932:
  - Irène Joliot-Curie and Frédéric Joliot show that if the unknown radiation generated by alpha particles falls on paraffin or any other hydrogen-containing compound, it ejects protons of very high energy. This is not in itself inconsistent with the proposed gamma ray nature of the new radiation, but detailed quantitative analysis of the data become increasingly difficult to reconcile with such a hypothesis.
  - James Chadwick performs a series of experiments showing that the gamma ray hypothesis for the unknown radiation produced by alpha particles is untenable, and that the new particles must be the neutrons hypothesized by Fermi.
  - Werner Heisenberg applies perturbation theory to the two-electron problem to show how resonance arising from electron exchange can explain Force carriers.
  - Mark Oliphant: Building upon the nuclear transmutation experiments of Ernest Rutherford done a few years earlier, observes fusion of light nuclei (hydrogen isotopes). The steps of the main cycle of nuclear fusion in stars are subsequently worked out by Hans Bethe over the next decade.
  - Carl D. Anderson experimentally proves the existence of the positron.
- 1933 – Following Chadwick's experiments, Fermi renames Pauli's "neutron" to neutrino to distinguish it from Chadwick's theory of the much more massive neutron.
- 1933 – Leó Szilárd first theorizes the concept of a nuclear chain reaction. He files a patent for his idea of a simple nuclear reactor the following year.
- 1934:
  - Fermi publishes a very successful model of beta decay in which neutrinos are produced.
  - Fermi studies the effects of bombarding uranium isotopes with neutrons.
  - N. N. Semyonov develops the total quantitative chain chemical reaction theory, later the basis of various high technologies using the incineration of gas mixtures. The idea is also used for the description of the nuclear reaction.
  - Irène Joliot-Curie and Frédéric Joliot-Curie discover artificial radioactivity and are jointly awarded the 1935 Nobel Prize in Chemistry
- 1935:
  - Einstein, Boris Podolsky, and Nathan Rosen describe the EPR paradox, which challenges the completeness of quantum mechanics as it was theorized up to that time. Assuming that local realism is valid, they demonstrated that there would need to be hidden parameters to explain how measuring the quantum state of one particle could influence the quantum state of another particle without apparent contact between them.
  - Schrödinger develops the Schrödinger's cat thought experiment. It illustrates what he saw as the problems of the Copenhagen interpretation of quantum mechanics if subatomic particles can be in two contradictory quantum states at once.
  - Hideki Yukawa predicts the existence of the pion, stating that such a potential arises from the exchange of a massive scalar field, as it would be found in the field of the pion. Prior to Yukawa's paper, it was believed that the scalar fields of the fundamental forces necessitated massless particles.
- 1936 – Alexandru Proca publishes prior to Hideki Yukawa his relativistic quantum field equations for a massive vector meson of spin-1 as a basis for nuclear forces.
- 1936 – Garrett Birkhoff and John von Neumann introduce Quantum Logic in an attempt to reconcile the apparent inconsistency of classical, Boolean logic with the Heisenberg Uncertainty Principle of quantum mechanics as applied, for example, to the measurement of complementary (noncommuting) observables in quantum mechanics, such as position and momentum; current approaches to quantum logic involve noncommutative and non-associative many-valued logic.
- 1936 – Carl D. Anderson discovers muons while he is studying cosmic radiation.
- 1937 – Hermann Arthur Jahn and Edward Teller prove, using group theory, that non-linear degenerate molecules are unstable. The Jahn–Teller theorem essentially states that any non-linear molecule with a degenerate electronic ground state will undergo a geometrical distortion that removes that degeneracy, because the distortion lowers the overall energy of the complex. The latter process is called the Jahn–Teller effect; this effect was recently considered also in relation to the superconductivity mechanism in YBCO and other high-temperature superconductors. The details of the Jahn–Teller effect are presented with several examples and EPR data in the basic textbook by Abragam and Bleaney (1970).
- 1938 – Charles Coulson makes the first accurate calculation of a molecular orbital wavefunction with the hydrogen molecule.
- 1938 – Otto Hahn and his assistant Fritz Strassmann send a manuscript to Naturwissenschaften reporting they have detected the element barium after bombarding uranium with neutrons. Hahn calls this new phenomenon a 'bursting' of the uranium nucleus. Simultaneously, Hahn communicates these results to Lise Meitner. Meitner, and her nephew Otto Robert Frisch, correctly interpret these results as being a nuclear fission. Frisch confirms this experimentally on 13 January 1939.
- 1939 – Leó Szilárd and Fermi discover neutron multiplication in uranium, proving that a chain reaction is indeed possible.

=== 1940–1949 ===
A Feynman diagram showing the radiation of a gluon when an electron and positron are annihilated

- 1942 – A team led by Enrico Fermi creates the first artificial self-sustaining nuclear chain reaction, called Chicago Pile-1, in a racquets court below the bleachers of Stagg Field at the University of Chicago on December 2, 1942.
- 1942 to 1946 – J. Robert Oppenheimer successfully leads the Manhattan Project, predicts quantum tunneling and proposes the Oppenheimer–Phillips process in nuclear fusion
- 1945 – the Manhattan Project produces the first nuclear fission explosion on July 16, 1945, in the Trinity test in New Mexico.
- 1945 – John Archibald Wheeler and Richard Feynman originate Wheeler–Feynman absorber theory, an interpretation of electrodynamics that supposes that elementary particles are not self-interacting.
- 1946 – Theodor V. Ionescu and Vasile Mihu report the construction of the first hydrogen maser by stimulated emission of radiation in molecular hydrogen.
- 1947 – Willis Lamb and Robert Retherford measure a small difference in energy between the energy levels ^{2}S_{1/2} and ^{2}P_{1/2} of the hydrogen atom, known as the Lamb shift.
- 1947 – George Rochester and Clifford Charles Butler publish two cloud chamber photographs of cosmic ray-induced events, one showing what appears to be a neutral particle decaying into two charged pions, and one that appears to be a charged particle decaying into a charged pion and something neutral. The estimated mass of the new particles is very rough, about half a proton's mass. More examples of these "V-particles" were slow in coming, and they are soon given the name kaons.
- 1948 – Sin-Itiro Tomonaga and Julian Schwinger independently introduce perturbative renormalization as a method of correcting the original Lagrangian of a quantum field theory so as to eliminate a series of infinite terms that would otherwise result.
- 1948 – Richard Feynman states the path integral formulation of quantum mechanics.
- 1949 – Freeman Dyson determines the equivalence of two formulations of quantum electrodynamics: Feynman's diagrammatic path integral formulation and the operator method developed by Julian Schwinger and Tomonaga. A by-product of that demonstration is the invention of the Dyson series.

=== 1950–1959 ===
- 1951:
  - Clemens C. J. Roothaan and George G. Hall derive the Roothaan–Hall equations, putting rigorous molecular orbital methods on a firm basis.
  - Edward Teller, physicist and "father of the hydrogen bomb", and Stanislaw Ulam, mathematician, are reported to have written jointly in March 1951 a classified report on "Hydrodynamic Lenses and Radiation Mirrors" that results in the next step in the Manhattan Project.
  - 1951 and 1952 – at the Manhattan Project, the first planned fusion thermonuclear reaction experiment is carried out successfully in the Spring of 1951 at Eniwetok, based on the work of Edward Teller and Dr. Hans A. Bethe. The Los Alamos Laboratory proposes a date in November 1952 for a hydrogen bomb, full-scale test that is apparently carried out.
  - Felix Bloch and Edward Mills Purcell receive a shared Nobel Prize in Physics for their first observations of the quantum phenomenon of nuclear magnetic resonance previously reported in 1949. Purcell reports his contribution as Research in Nuclear Magnetism, and gives credit to his coworkers such as Herbert S. Gutowsky for their NMR contributions, as well as theoretical researchers of nuclear magnetism such as John Hasbrouck Van Vleck.
- 1952 – Albert W. Overhauser formulates a theory of dynamic nuclear polarization, also known as the Overhauser Effect; other contenders are the subsequent theory of Ionel Solomon reported in 1955 that includes the Solomon equations for the dynamics of coupled spins, and that of R. Kaiser in 1963. The general Overhauser effect is first demonstrated experimentally by T. R. Carver and Charles P. Slichter in 1953.
- 1952 – Donald A. Glaser creates the bubble chamber, which allows detection of electrically charged particles by surrounding them by a bubble. Properties of the particles such as momentum can be determined by studying their helical paths. Glaser receives a Nobel prize in 1960 for his invention.
- 1953 – Charles H. Townes, collaborating with James P. Gordon, and Herbert J. Zeiger, builds the first ammonia maser; receives a Nobel prize in 1964 for his experimental success in producing coherent radiation by atoms and molecules.
- 1954 – Chen Ning Yang and Robert Mills derive a gauge theory for nonabelian groups, leading to the successful formulation of both electroweak unification and quantum chromodynamics.
- 1955 – Ionel Solomon develops the first nuclear magnetic resonance theory of magnetic dipole coupled nuclear spins and of the Nuclear Overhauser effect.
- 1956 – P. Kuroda predicts that self-sustaining nuclear chain reactions should occur in natural uranium deposits.
- 1956 – Chien-Shiung Wu carries out the Wu Experiment, which observes parity violation in cobalt-60 decay, showing that parity violation is present in the weak interaction.
- 1956 – Clyde L. Cowan and Frederick Reines experimentally prove the existence of the neutrino.
- 1957 – John Bardeen, Leon Cooper and John Robert Schrieffer propose their quantum BCS theory of low temperature superconductivity, for which they receive a Nobel prize in 1972. The theory represents superconductivity as a macroscopic quantum coherence phenomenon involving phonon coupled electron pairs with opposite spin
- 1957 – William Alfred Fowler, Margaret Burbidge, Geoffrey Burbidge, and Fred Hoyle, in their 1957 paper Synthesis of the Elements in Stars, show that the abundances of essentially all but the lightest chemical elements can be explained by the process of nucleosynthesis in stars.
- 1957 – Hugh Everett formulates the many-worlds interpretation of quantum mechanics, which states that every possible quantum outcome is realized in divergent, non-communicating parallel universes in quantum superposition.
- 1958–1959 – magic-angle spinning described by Edward Raymond Andrew, A. Bradbury, and R. G. Eades, and independently in 1959 by I. J. Lowe.

=== 1960–1969 ===
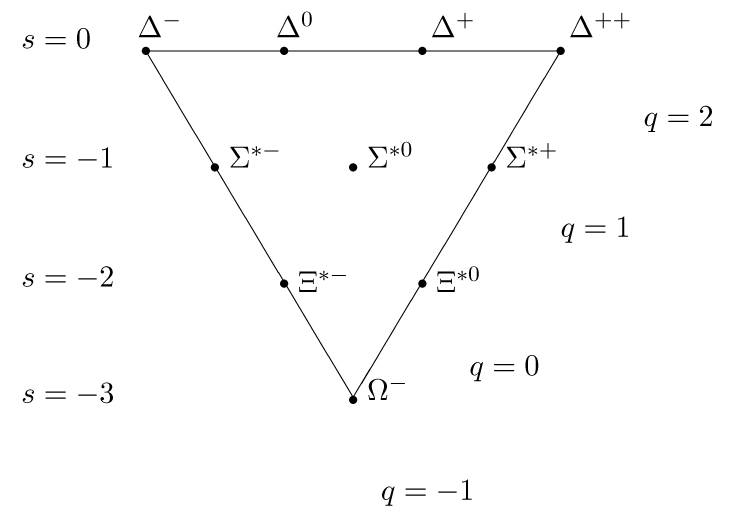
The baryon decuplet of the Eightfold Way proposed by Murray Gell-Mann in 1962. The Ω^{−} particle at the bottom had not yet been observed at the time, but a particle closely matching these predictions was discovered by a particle accelerator group at Brookhaven, proving Gell-Mann's theory.

- 1961 – Claus Jönsson performs Young's double-slit experiment (1909) for the first time with particles other than photons by using electrons and with similar results, confirming that massive particles also behaved according to the wave–particle duality that is a fundamental principle of quantum field theory.
- 1961 – Anatole Abragam publishes the fundamental textbook on the quantum theory of Nuclear Magnetic Resonance entitled The Principles of Nuclear Magnetism;
- 1961 – Sheldon Glashow extends the electroweak interaction models developed by Julian Schwinger by including a short range neutral current, the Z_{o}. The resulting symmetry structure that Glashow proposes, SU(2) × U(1), forms the basis of the accepted theory of the electroweak interactions.
- 1962 – Leon M. Lederman, Melvin Schwartz and Jack Steinberger show that more than one type of neutrino exists by detecting interactions of the muon neutrino (already hypothesised with the name "neutretto")
- 1962 – Jeffrey Goldstone, Yoichiro Nambu, Abdus Salam, and Steven Weinberg develop what is now known as Goldstone's Theorem: if there is a continuous symmetry transformation under which the Lagrangian is invariant, then either the vacuum state is also invariant under the transformation, or there must be spinless particles of zero mass, thereafter called Nambu–Goldstone bosons.
- 1962 to 1973 – Brian David Josephson, predicts correctly the quantum tunneling effect involving superconducting currents while he is a PhD student under the supervision of Professor Brian Pippard at the Royal Society Mond Laboratory in Cambridge, UK; subsequently, in 1964, he applies his theory to coupled superconductors. The effect is later demonstrated experimentally at Bell Labs in the US. For his important quantum discovery he is awarded the Nobel Prize in Physics in 1973.
- 1963 – Eugene P. Wigner lays the foundation for the theory of symmetries in quantum mechanics as well as for basic research into the structure of the atomic nucleus; makes important "contributions to the theory of the atomic nucleus and the elementary particles, particularly through the discovery and application of fundamental symmetry principles"; he shares half of his Nobel prize in Physics with Maria Goeppert-Mayer and J. Hans D. Jensen.
- 1963 – Maria Goeppert Mayer and J. Hans D. Jensen share with Eugene P. Wigner half of the Nobel Prize in Physics in 1963 "for their discoveries concerning nuclear shell structure theory".
- 1964 – John Stewart Bell puts forth Bell's theorem, which used testable inequality relations to show the flaws in the earlier Einstein–Podolsky–Rosen paradox and prove that no physical theory of local hidden variables can ever reproduce all of the predictions of quantum mechanics. This inaugurated the study of quantum entanglement, the phenomenon in which separate particles share the same quantum state despite being at a distance from each other.
- 1964 – Nikolai G. Basov and Aleksandr M. Prokhorov share the Nobel Prize in Physics in 1964 for, respectively, semiconductor lasers and Quantum Electronics; they also share the prize with Charles Hard Townes, the inventor of the ammonium maser.
- 1969 to 1977 – Sir Nevill Mott and Philip Warren Anderson publish quantum theories for electrons in non-crystalline solids, such as glasses and amorphous semiconductors; receive in 1977 a Nobel prize in Physics for their investigations into the electronic structure of magnetic and disordered systems, which allow for the development of electronic switching and memory devices in computers. The prize is shared with John Hasbrouck Van Vleck for his contributions to the understanding of the behavior of electrons in magnetic solids; he established the fundamentals of the quantum mechanical theory of magnetism and the crystal field theory (chemical bonding in metal complexes) and is regarded as the Father of modern Magnetism.
- 1969 and 1970 – Theodor V. Ionescu, Radu Pârvan and I.C. Baianu observe and report quantum amplified stimulation of electromagnetic radiation in hot deuterium plasmas in a longitudinal magnetic field; publish a quantum theory of the amplified coherent emission of radiowaves and microwaves by focused electron beams coupled to ions in hot plasmas.

=== 1971–1979 ===
- 1971 – Martinus J. G. Veltman and Gerardus 't Hooft show that, if the symmetries of Yang–Mills theory are broken according to the method suggested by Peter Higgs, then Yang–Mills theory can be renormalized. The renormalization of Yang–Mills Theory predicts the existence of a massless particle, called the gluon, which could explain the nuclear strong force. It also explains how the particles of the weak interaction, the W and Z bosons, obtain their mass via spontaneous symmetry breaking and the Yukawa interaction.
- 1972 – Francis Perrin discovers "natural nuclear fission reactors" in uranium deposits in Oklo, Gabon, where analysis of isotope ratios demonstrate that self-sustaining, nuclear chain reactions have occurred. The conditions under which a natural nuclear reactor could exist were predicted in 1956 by P. Kuroda.
- 1973 – Peter Mansfield formulates the physical theory of nuclear magnetic resonance imaging (NMRI) aka magnetic resonance imaging (MRI).
- 1974 – Pier Giorgio Merli performs Young's double-slit experiment (1909) using a single electron with similar results, confirming the existence of quantum fields for massive particles.
- 1977 – Ilya Prigogine develops non-equilibrium, irreversible thermodynamics and quantum operator theory, especially the time superoperator theory; he is awarded the Nobel Prize in Chemistry in 1977 "for his contributions to non-equilibrium thermodynamics, particularly the theory of dissipative structures".
- 1978 – Pyotr Kapitsa observes new phenomena in hot deuterium plasmas excited by very high power microwaves in attempts to obtain controlled thermonuclear fusion reactions in such plasmas placed in longitudinal magnetic fields, using a novel and low-cost design of thermonuclear reactor, similar in concept to that reported by Theodor V. Ionescu et al. in 1969. Receives a Nobel prize for early low temperature physics experiments on helium superfluidity carried out in 1937 at the Cavendish Laboratory in Cambridge, UK, and discusses his 1977 thermonuclear reactor results in his Nobel lecture on December 8, 1978.
- 1979 – Kenneth A. Rubinson and coworkers, at the Cavendish Laboratory, observe ferromagnetic spin wave resonant excitations in metallic glasses and interpret the observations in terms of two-magnon dispersion and a spin exchange Hamiltonian, similar in form to that of a Heisenberg ferromagnet.

=== 1980–1999 ===
- 1980 to 1982 – Alain Aspect verifies experimentally the quantum entanglement hypothesis; his Bell test experiments provide strong evidence that a quantum event at one location can affect an event at another location without any obvious mechanism for communication between the two locations. This remarkable result confirmed the experimental verification of quantum entanglement by John F. Clauser. and. Stuart Freedman in 1972. Aspect later shared the 2022 Nobel Prize in Physics with Clauser and Anton Zeilinger "for experiments with entangled photons, establishing the violation of Bell inequalities and pioneering quantum information science".
- 1982 to 1997 – Tokamak Fusion Test Reactor (TFTR) at PPPL, Princeton, US: Operated since 1982, produces 10.7 MW of controlled fusion power for only 0.21 s in 1994 by using T–D nuclear fusion in a tokamak reactor with "a toroidal 6T magnetic field for plasma confinement, a 3 MA plasma current and an electron density of 1.0×10^{20} m^{−3} of 13.5 keV".
- 1983 – Carlo Rubbia and Simon van der Meer, at the Super Proton Synchrotron, see unambiguous signals of W particles in January. The actual experiments are called UA1 (led by Rubbia) and UA2 (led by Peter Jenni), and are the collaborative effort of many people. Simon van der Meer is the driving force on the use of the accelerator. UA1 and UA2 find the Z particle a few months later, in May 1983.
- 1983 to 2011 – The largest and most powerful experimental nuclear fusion tokamak reactor in the world, Joint European Torus (JET) begins operation at Culham Facility in UK; operates with T–D plasma pulses and has a reported gain factor Q of 0.7 in 2009, with an input of 40MW for plasma heating, and a 2800-ton iron magnet for confinement; in 1997 in a tritium–deuterium experiment JET produces 16 MW of fusion power, a total of 22 MJ of fusion, energy and a steady fusion power of 4 MW, which is maintained for 4 seconds.
- 1985 to 2010 – The JT-60 (Japan Torus) begins operation in 1985 with an experimental D–D nuclear fusion tokamak similar to the JET; in 2010 JT-60 holds the record for the highest value of the fusion triple product achieved: 1.77×10^{28} K·s·m^{−3} = 1.53×10^{21} keV·s·m^{−3}. JT-60 claims it would have an equivalent energy gain factor, Q of 1.25 if it were operated with a T–D plasma instead of the D–D plasma, and on May 9, 2006, attains a fusion hold time of 28.6 s in full operation; moreover, a high-power microwave gyrotron construction is completed that is capable of 1.5 MW output for 1 s, thus meeting the conditions for the planned ITER, large-scale nuclear fusion reactor. JT-60 is disassembled in 2010 to be upgraded to a more powerful nuclear fusion reactor—the JT-60SA—by using niobium–titanium superconducting coils for the magnet confining the ultra-hot D–D plasma.
- 1986 – Johannes Georg Bednorz and Karl Alexander Müller produce unambiguous experimental proof of high-temperature superconductivity involving Jahn–Teller polarons in orthorhombic La_{2}CuO_{4}, YBCO and other perovskite-type oxides; promptly receive a Nobel prize in 1987 and deliver their Nobel lecture on December 8, 1987.
- 1986 – Vladimir Gershonovich Drinfeld introduces the concept of quantum groups as Hopf algebras in his seminal address on quantum theory at the International Congress of Mathematicians, and also connects them to the study of the Yang–Baxter equation, which is a necessary condition for the solvability of statistical mechanics models; he also generalizes Hopf algebras to quasi-Hopf algebras, and introduces the study of Drinfeld twists, which can be used to factorize the R-matrix corresponding to the solution of the Yang–Baxter equation associated with a quasitriangular Hopf algebra.
- 1988 to 1998 – Mihai Gavrilă discovers in 1988 the new quantum phenomenon of atomic dichotomy in hydrogen and subsequently publishes a book on the atomic structure and decay in high-frequency fields of hydrogen atoms placed in ultra-intense laser fields.
- 1991 – Richard R. Ernst develops two-dimensional nuclear magnetic resonance spectroscopy (2D-FT NMRS) for small molecules in solution and is awarded the Nobel Prize in Chemistry in 1991 "for his contributions to the development of the methodology of high-resolution nuclear magnetic resonance (NMR) spectroscopy".
- 1995 – Eric Cornell, Carl Wieman and Wolfgang Ketterle and co-workers at JILA create the first "pure" Bose–Einstein condensate. They do this by cooling a dilute vapor consisting of approximately two thousand rubidium-87 atoms to below 170 nK using a combination of laser cooling and magnetic evaporative cooling. About four months later, an independent effort led by Wolfgang Ketterle at MIT creates a condensate made of sodium-23. Ketterle's condensate has about a hundred times more atoms, allowing him to obtain several important results such as the observation of quantum mechanical interference between two different condensates.
- 1997 – Peter Shor publishes Shor's algorithm, a quantum computing algorithm for finding prime factors of integers. The algorithm is one of the few known quantum algorithms with immediate potential applications, which likely leads to a superpolynomial improvement over known non-quantum algorithms.
- 1999 to 2013 – NSTX—The National Spherical Torus Experiment at PPPL, Princeton, US launches a nuclear fusion project on February 12, 1999, for "an innovative magnetic fusion device that was constructed by the Princeton Plasma Physics Laboratory (PPPL) in collaboration with the Oak Ridge National Laboratory, Columbia University, and the University of Washington at Seattle"; NSTX is being used to study the physics principles of spherically shaped plasmas.

== 21st century ==
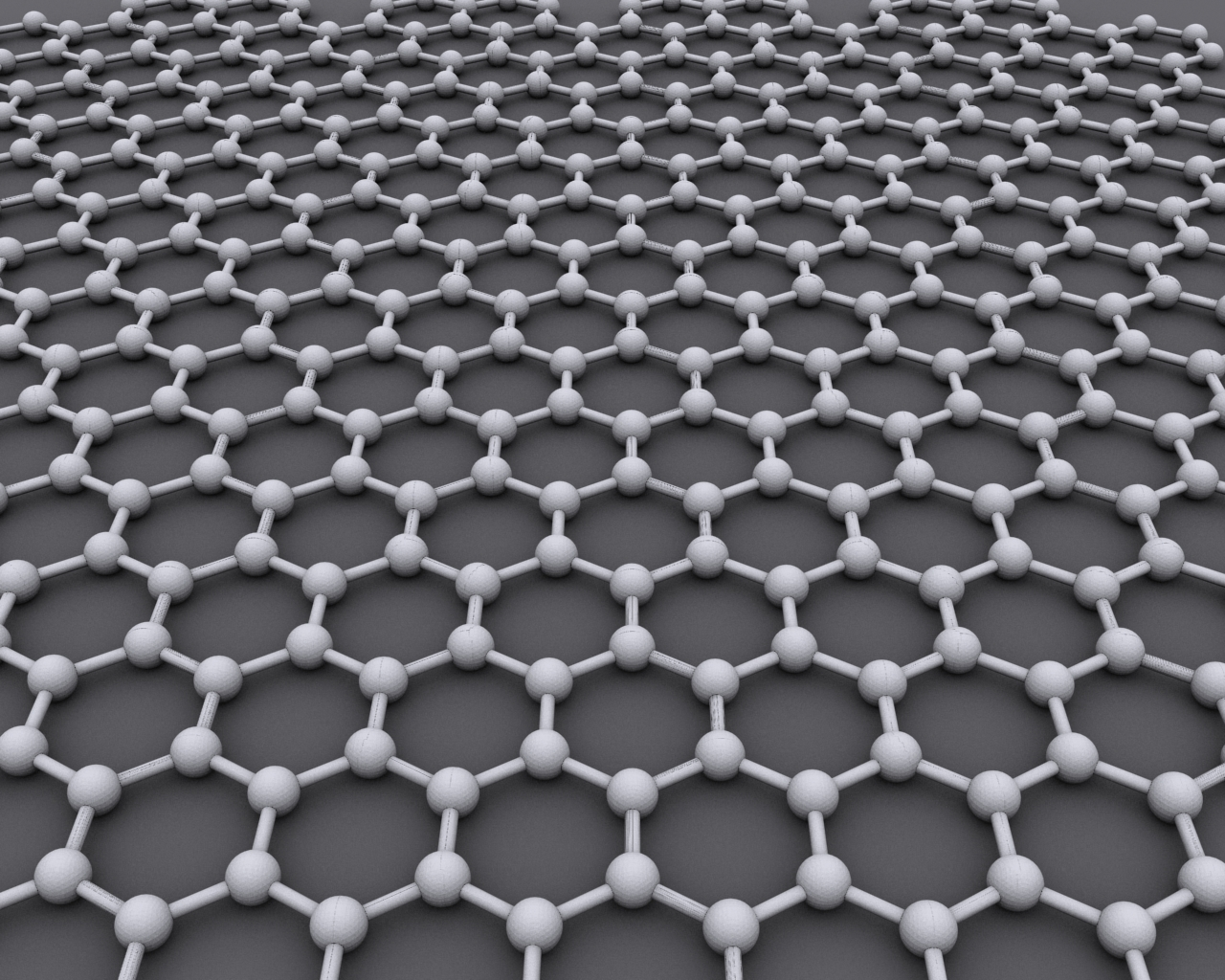
Graphene is a planar atomic-scale honeycomb lattice made of carbon atoms, which exhibits unusual and interesting quantum properties.

- 2001 – Researchers at IBM physically implement Shor's algorithm with an NMR setup, factoring 15 into 3 times 5 using seven qubits.
- 2002 – Leonid I. Vainerman organizes a meeting at Strasbourg of theoretical physicists and mathematicians focused on quantum group and quantum groupoid applications in quantum theories; the proceedings of the meeting are published in 2003 in a book edited by the meeting organizer.
- 2009 – Aaron D. O'Connell invents the first quantum machine, applying quantum mechanics to a macroscopic object just large enough to be seen by the naked eye, which is able to vibrate a small amount and large amount simultaneously.
- 2011 – Zachary Dutton demonstrates how photons can co-exist in superconductors. "Direct Observation of Coherent Population Trapping in a Superconducting Artificial Atom",
- 2012 – The existence of Higgs boson was confirmed by the ATLAS and CMS collaborations based on proton-proton collisions in the Large Hadron Collider at CERN. Peter Higgs and François Englert were awarded the 2013 Nobel Prize in Physics for their theoretical predictions.
- 2015 – The first loophole-free Bell tests are performed by three independent teams, led by Ronald Hanson and Bas Hensen at TU Delft, by Sae Woo Nam and Krister Shalm at NIST, and by Anton Zeilinger and Marissa Giustina at the University of Vienna, confirming precisely the predictions of quantum mechanics and ruling out any local-realistic description of nature. These experiments are the culmination of a series of experiments started by John Clauser in the 1970s and significantly advanced by Alain Aspect in the 1980s among others. Clauser, Aspect, and Zeilinger share the Nobel Prize in Physics 2022 for their results.

== See also ==
- History of quantum mechanics
- Timeline of atomic and subatomic physics
- Timeline of particle physics
- Timeline of physical chemistry
- List of scientific publications by Albert Einstein

== Bibliography ==
- Peacock, Kent A. (2008). The Quantum Revolution: A Historical Perspective. Westport, Conn.: Greenwood Press. ISBN 9780313334481.
- Ben-Menahem, A. (2009). "Historical timeline of quantum mechanics 1925–1989". Historical Encyclopedia of Natural and Mathematical Sciences (1st ed.). Berlin: Springer. pp. 4342–4349. ISBN 9783540688310.
