= Quasi-Hopf algebra =

A quasi-Hopf algebra is a generalization of a Hopf algebra, which was defined by the Ukrainian mathematician Vladimir Drinfeld in 1989.

A quasi-Hopf algebra is a quasi-bialgebra $\mathcal{B_A} = (\mathcal{A}, \Delta, \varepsilon, \Phi)$ for which there exist $\alpha, \beta \in \mathcal{A}$ and a bijective antihomomorphism S (antipode) of $\mathcal{A}$ such that

$$\sum_i S(b_i) \alpha c_i = \varepsilon(a) \alpha$$
$$\sum_i b_i \beta S(c_i) = \varepsilon(a) \beta$$

for all $a \in \mathcal{A}$ and where

$$\Delta(a) = \sum_i b_i \otimes c_i$$

and

$$\sum_i X_i \beta S(Y_i) \alpha Z_i = \mathbb{I},$$
$$\sum_j S(P_j) \alpha Q_j \beta S(R_j) = \mathbb{I}.$$

where the expansions for the quantities $\Phi$and $\Phi^{-1}$ are given by

$$\Phi = \sum_i X_i \otimes Y_i \otimes Z_i$$

and

$$\Phi^{-1}= \sum_j P_j \otimes Q_j \otimes R_j.$$

As for a quasi-bialgebra, the property of being quasi-Hopf is preserved under twisting.

== Usage ==
Quasi-Hopf algebras form the basis of the study of Drinfeld twists and the representations in terms of F-matrices associated with finite-dimensional irreducible representations of quantum affine algebra. F-matrices can be used to factorize the corresponding R-matrix. This leads to applications in Statistical mechanics, as quantum affine algebras, and their representations give rise to solutions of the Yang–Baxter equation, a solvability condition for various statistical models, allowing characteristics of the model to be deduced from its corresponding quantum affine algebra. The study of F-matrices has been applied to models such as the Heisenberg XXZ model in the framework of the algebraic Bethe ansatz. It provides a framework for solving two-dimensional integrable models by using the quantum inverse scattering method.

== See also ==
- Quasitriangular Hopf algebra
- Quasi-triangular quasi-Hopf algebra
- Ribbon Hopf algebra
