= Quasi-bialgebra =

Generalization of bialgebra

In mathematics, quasi-bialgebras are a generalization of bialgebras: they were first defined by the Ukrainian mathematician Vladimir Drinfeld in 1990. A quasi-bialgebra differs from a bialgebra by having coassociativity replaced by an invertible element $\Phi$ which controls the non-coassociativity. One of their key properties is that the corresponding category of modules forms a tensor category.

== Definition ==
A quasi-bialgebra $\mathcal{B_A} = (\mathcal{A}, \Delta, \varepsilon, \Phi,l,r)$ is an algebra $\mathcal{A}$ over a field $\mathbb{F}$ equipped with morphisms of algebras

$$\Delta : \mathcal{A} \rightarrow \mathcal{A \otimes A}$$
$$\varepsilon : \mathcal{A} \rightarrow \mathbb{F}$$

along with invertible elements $\Phi \in \mathcal{A \otimes A \otimes A}$, and $r,l \in A$ such that the following identities hold:

$$(id \otimes \Delta) \circ \Delta(a) = \Phi \lbrack (\Delta \otimes id) \circ \Delta (a) \rbrack \Phi^{-1}, \quad \forall a \in \mathcal{A}$$
$$\lbrack (id \otimes id \otimes \Delta)(\Phi) \rbrack \ \lbrack (\Delta \otimes id \otimes id)(\Phi) \rbrack = (1 \otimes \Phi) \ \lbrack (id \otimes \Delta \otimes id)(\Phi) \rbrack \ (\Phi \otimes 1)$$
$$(\varepsilon \otimes id)(\Delta a) = l^{-1} a l, \qquad (id \otimes \varepsilon) \circ \Delta = r^{-1} a r, \quad \forall a \in \mathcal{A}$$
$$(id \otimes \varepsilon \otimes id)(\Phi) =  r \otimes l^{-1}.$$

Where $\Delta$ and $\epsilon$ are called the comultiplication and counit, $r$ and $l$ are called the right and left unit constraints (resp.), and $\Phi$ is sometimes called the Drinfeld associator. This definition is constructed so that the category $\mathcal{A}-Mod$ is a tensor category under the usual vector space tensor product, and in fact this can be taken as the definition instead of the list of above identities. Since many of the quasi-bialgebras that appear "in nature" have trivial unit constraints, ie. $l=r=1$ the definition may sometimes be given with this assumed. Note that a bialgebra is just a quasi-bialgebra with trivial unit and associativity constraints: $l=r=1$ and $\Phi=1 \otimes 1 \otimes 1$.

== Braided quasi-bialgebras ==
A braided quasi-bialgebra (also called a quasi-triangular quasi-bialgebra) is a quasi-bialgebra whose corresponding tensor category $\mathcal{A}-Mod$ is braided. Equivalently, by analogy with braided bialgebras, we can construct a notion of a universal R-matrix which controls the non-cocommutativity of a quasi-bialgebra. The definition is the same as in the braided bialgebra case except for additional complications in the formulas caused by adding in the associator.

Proposition: A quasi-bialgebra $(\mathcal{A},\Delta,\epsilon,\Phi,l,r)$ is braided if it has a universal R-matrix, ie an invertible element $R \in \mathcal{A \otimes A}$ such that the following 3 identities hold:

$$(\Delta^{op})(a)=R \Delta(a) R^{-1}$$

$$(id \otimes \Delta)(R)=(\Phi_{231})^{-1} R_{13} \Phi_{213} R_{12} (\Phi_{213})^{-1}$$

$$(\Delta \otimes id)(R)=(\Phi_{321}) R_{13} (\Phi_{213})^{-1} R_{23} \Phi_{123}$$

Where, for every $a_1 \otimes ... \otimes a_k \in \mathcal{A}^{\otimes k}$, $a_{i_1 i_2 ... i_n}$ is the monomial with $a_j$ in the $i_j$th spot, where any omitted numbers correspond to the identity in that spot. Finally we extend this by linearity to all of $\mathcal{A}^{\otimes k}$.

Again, similar to the braided bialgebra case, this universal R-matrix satisfies (a non-associative version of) the Yang–Baxter equation:

$R_{12}\Phi_{321}R_{13}(\Phi_{132})^{-1}R_{23}\Phi_{123}=\Phi_{321}R_{23}(\Phi_{231})^{-1}R_{13}\Phi_{213}R_{12}$

== Twisting ==
Given a quasi-bialgebra, further quasi-bialgebras can be generated by twisting (from now on we will assume $r=l=1$) .

If $\mathcal{B_A}$ is a quasi-bialgebra and $F \in \mathcal{A \otimes A}$ is an invertible element such that $(\varepsilon \otimes id) F = (id \otimes \varepsilon) F = 1$, set

$$\Delta ' (a) = F \Delta (a) F^{-1}, \quad \forall a \in \mathcal{A}$$
$$\Phi ' = (1 \otimes  F) \ ((id \otimes \Delta) F) \ \Phi \ ((\Delta \otimes id)F^{-1}) \ (F^{-1} \otimes 1).$$

Then, the set $(\mathcal{A}, \Delta ' , \varepsilon, \Phi ')$ is also a quasi-bialgebra obtained by twisting $\mathcal{B_A}$ by F, which is called a twist or gauge transformation. If $(\mathcal{A},\Delta,\varepsilon, \Phi)$ was a braided quasi-bialgebra with universal R-matrix $R$ , then so is $(\mathcal{A},\Delta',\varepsilon, \Phi ')$ with universal R-matrix $F_{21}RF^{-1}$ (using the notation from the above section). However, the twist of a bialgebra is only in general a quasi-bialgebra. Twistings fulfill many expected properties. For example, twisting by $F_1$ and then $F_2$ is equivalent to twisting by $F_2F_1$, and twisting by $F$ then $F^{-1}$ recovers the original quasi-bialgebra.

Twistings have the important property that they induce categorical equivalences on the tensor category of modules:

Theorem: Let $\mathcal{B_A}$, $\mathcal{B_{A'}}$ be quasi-bialgebras, let $\mathcal{B'_{A'}}$ be the twisting of $\mathcal{B_{A'}}$ by $F$, and let there exist an isomorphism: $\alpha:\mathcal{B_A} \to \mathcal{B'_{A'}}$. Then the induced tensor functor $(\alpha^*,id,\phi_2^F)$ is a tensor category equivalence between $\mathcal{A'}-mod$ and $\mathcal{A}-mod$. Where $\phi_2^F(v \otimes w)=F^{-1}(v \otimes w)$. Moreover, if $\alpha$ is an isomorphism of braided quasi-bialgebras, then the above induced functor is a braided tensor category equivalence.

== Usage ==
Quasi-bialgebras form the basis of the study of quasi-Hopf algebras and further to the study of Drinfeld twists and the representations in terms of F-matrices associated with finite-dimensional irreducible representations of quantum affine algebra. F-matrices can be used to factorize the corresponding R-matrix. This leads to applications in statistical mechanics, as quantum affine algebras, and their representations give rise to solutions of the Yang–Baxter equation, a solvability condition for various statistical models, allowing characteristics of the model to be deduced from its corresponding quantum affine algebra. The study of F-matrices has been applied to models such as the XXZ in the framework of the Algebraic Bethe ansatz.

== See also ==
- Bialgebra
- Hopf algebra
- Quasi-Hopf algebra
