= Yang–Baxter operator =

Invertible linear endomorphism

Yang–Baxter operators are invertible linear endomorphisms with applications in theoretical physics and topology. They are named after theoretical physicists Yang Chen-Ning and Rodney Baxter. These operators are particularly notable for providing solutions to the quantum Yang–Baxter equation, which originated in statistical mechanics, and for their use in constructing invariants of knots, links, and three-dimensional manifolds.

== Definition ==
In the category of left modules over a commutative ring $k$, Yang–Baxter operators are $k$-linear mappings $R: V \otimes_k V \rightarrow V \otimes_k V$. The operator $R$ satisfies the quantum Yang-Baxter equation if

$R_{12}R_{13}R_{23} = R_{23}R_{13}R_{12}$

where

$R_{12} = R \otimes_k 1$,
$R_{23} = 1 \otimes_k R$,
$R_{13} = (1 \otimes_k \tau_{V,V})(R \otimes_k 1)(1 \otimes_k \tau_{V,V})$

The $\tau_{U,V}$ represents the "twist" mapping defined for $k$-modules $U$ and $V$ by $\tau_{U,V}(u \otimes v) = v \otimes u$ for all $u \in U$ and $v \in V$.

An important relationship exists between the quantum Yang-Baxter equation and the braid equation. If $R$ satisfies the quantum Yang-Baxter equation, then $B = \tau_{V,V}R$ satisfies $B_{12}B_{23}B_{12} = B_{23}B_{12}B_{23}$.

== Applications ==
Yang–Baxter operators have applications in statistical mechanics and topology.

== See also ==
- Yang–Baxter equation
- Hopf algebra
- Lie bialgebra
- Yangian
- Braid theory
- Quantum groups
