= Representation theory of Hopf algebras =

Study of Hopf algebras via their actions on vector spaces and associative algebras

In abstract algebra, a representation of a Hopf algebra is a representation of its underlying associative algebra. The representation theory of Hopf algebras is of particular interest because it has more structure than that of more general associative algebras; in particular, there exist duals and tensor products, similarly to the representations of finite groups and Lie algebras.

These natural operations on the category of representations of a Hopf algebra (whose objects are the representations and whose morphism are the equivariant maps) give it additional structure:

- The existence of tensor products (and trivial representations) make the category of representations into a monoidal category,
- The existence of duals makes this category rigid,
- If $H$ is quasitriangular, the category is braided monoidal,
- If $H$ is co-commutative, or more generally if it is triangular, the category is symmetric monoidal.

These facts can be taken as motivation for studying Hopf algebras.

== Definition and basic properties ==
A representation of a Hopf algebra $H$ over a field $K$ is a $K$-vector space $V$ with an action $H \times V \to V$ usually denoted by juxtaposition (that is, the image of $(h,v)$ is written $hv$) that is compatible with the vector space structures of $H$ and $V$. The vector space $V$ is called an $H$-module.

The module structure of a representation of a Hopf algebra $H$ is simply its structure as a module for the underlying associative algebra. The main use of considering the additional structure of a Hopf algebra is when considering all $H$-modules as a category. The additional structure is also used to define invariant elements of an $H$-module $V$. An element $v$ in $V$ is invariant under $H$ if for all $h$ in $H$, $hv = \epsilon(h)v$, where $\epsilon$ is the counit of $H$. The subset of all invariant elements of $V$ forms a submodule of $V$.

== Relation to the representation theory of other structures ==
Hopf algebra representations are a generalisation of both representations of finite groups and those of Lie algebras. For a fixed underlying field $K$, the representations of a finite group $G$ are in one-to-one correspondence with those of its group algebra $KG$. Similarly, the representations of a Lie algebra $\mathfrak{g}$ are in one-to-one correspondence with those of its universal enveloping algebra $U(\mathfrak{g})$. Both $KG$ and $U(\mathfrak{g})$ are in turn Hopf algebras, and many types of Hopf algebra, such as quantum groups, arise as deformations or "quantisations" of these classical examples.

Like representations of groups, Lie algebras and quantum groups, one can take duals and tensor products of representations of a Hopf algebra, and there exist trivial representations which act as multiplicative units with respect to the tensor product. These operations do not exist for the representations of more general associative algebras.

== Categories of representations as a motivation for Hopf algebras ==
For an associative algebra $H$, the tensor product $V_1\otimes V_2$ of two $H$-modules $V_1$ and $V_2$ is a vector space, but not necessarily an $H$-module. For the tensor product to be a functorial product operation on $H$-modules, there must be a linear binary operation $\Delta:H\to H\otimes H$ such that for any $v_i$ in $V_i$ and any $h\in H$,

$$hv=\Delta(h)(v_1\otimes v_2)=h_{(1)}v_1\otimes h_{(2)}v_2,$$

and for any $v_i\in V_i$ and $a,b\in H$

$$\Delta(ab)(v_1\otimes v_2)=(ab)v=a(b(v))=\Delta(a)(\Delta(b)(v_1\otimes v_2))=(\Delta(a)\Delta(b))(v_1\otimes v_2).$$

using sumless Sweedler's notation, which is somewhat like an index free form of the Einstein summation convention. This is satisfied if there is a $\Delta$ such that $\Delta(ab)=\Delta(a)\Delta(b)$ for all $a,b\in H$.

For the category of $H$-modules to be a monoidal category with respect to $\otimes$, there must be natural isomorphisms (called associators) between $V_1\otimes(V_2\otimes V_3)$ and $(V_1\otimes V_2)\otimes V_3$ for all $V_i$, and there must be unit object $\epsilon_H$, called the trivial module, such that for any module $V$ there are natural isomorphisms between $\epsilon_H\otimes V$, $V$ and $V\otimes\epsilon_H$.

This means that for $v_1\otimes v_2\otimes v_3$ in

$$V_1\otimes(V_2\otimes V_3)=(V_1\otimes V_2)\otimes V_3,$$

(where we use the natural identification of vector spaces) and for $h$ in $H$,

$$((\operatorname{id}\otimes \Delta)\Delta(h))(v_1\otimes v_2\otimes v_3)
= ((\Delta\otimes \operatorname{id}) \Delta(h)) (v_1\otimes v_2\otimes v_3),$$

or in Sweedler notation,

$$h_{(1)}v_1\otimes h_{(2)(1)}v_2\otimes h_{(2)(2)}v_3
= h_{(1)(1)}v_1\otimes h_{(1)(2)}v_2\otimes h_{(2)}v_3.$$

This will hold for any three $H$-modules if $\Delta$ satisfies

$$(\operatorname{id}\otimes \Delta)\Delta = (\Delta \otimes \operatorname{id})\Delta.$$

The trivial module must be one-dimensional, and so an algebra homomorphism $\epsilon:H\to K$ may be defined such that $hv=\epsilon(h)v$ for all $v\in\epsilon_H$. The trivial module may be identified with $K$, with $1$ being the element such that $1\otimes v = v = v\otimes 1$ for all $v$. For the desired property, we require that for any $v$ in any $H$-module $V$, any $c\in\epsilon_H$ and any $h\in H$,

$$(\varepsilon(h_{(1)})h_{(2)})cv = h_{(1)}c\otimes h_{(2)}v = h(c\otimes v) = h(cv),$$

and similarly

$$(h_{(1)}\varepsilon(h_{(2)}))cv = h(cv).$$

The existence of an algebra homomorphism $\epsilon$ satisfying

$$\varepsilon(h_{(1)})h_{(2)} = h = h_{(1)}\varepsilon(h_{(2)})$$

is a sufficient condition for the existence of the trivial module.

It follows that in order for the category of $H$-modules to be a monoidal category with respect to the tensor product, it is sufficient for $H$ to have maps $\Delta$ and $\epsilon$ satisfying these conditions. This is the motivation for the definition of a bialgebra, where $\Delta$ is called the comultiplication and $\epsilon$ is called the counit.

In order for each $H$-module $V$ to have a dual representation $V$ such that the underlying vector spaces are dual and the operation * is functorial over the monoidal category of $H$-modules, there must be a linear map $S:H\to H$ such that for any $h\in H$, $x\in V$ and $y\in V^*$,

$$\langle y, S(h)x\rangle = \langle hy, x \rangle.$$

where $\langle\cdot,\cdot\rangle$ is the usual pairing of dual vector spaces. If the map $\varphi:V\otimes V^*\rightarrow \varepsilon_H$ induced by the pairing is to be an $H$-homomorphism, then for any $h\in H$, $x\in V$ and $y\in V^*$,

$$\varphi\left(h(x\otimes y)\right)=\varphi\left(x\otimes S(h_{(1)})h_{(2)}y\right)=\varphi\left(S(h_{(2)})h_{(1)}x\otimes y\right)=h\varphi(x\otimes y)=\varepsilon(h)\varphi(x\otimes y),$$

which is satisfied if

$$S(h_{(1)})h_{(2)}=\varepsilon(h)=h_{(1)}S(h_{(2)})$$

for all $h\in H$.

If there is such a map $S$, then it is called an antipode, and $H$ is a Hopf algebra. The desire for a monoidal category of modules with functorial tensor products and dual representations is therefore one motivation for the concept of a Hopf algebra.

== Representations on an algebra ==
A Hopf algebra also has representations which carry additional structure, namely they are algebras.

Let $H$ be a Hopf algebra over a field $K$, let $A$ be a (unital) associative algebra over $K$ with the product operation $\mu: A\otimes A \to A$ (and unit map $u:K\to A$), and suppose that $\rho: H\otimes A \to A$ is a representation of $H$ on $A$. From the discussion above, $A\otimes A$ is naturally an $H$-module. We say that $\rho$ is a representation of $H$ on an algebra, or that $A$ is an $H$-module algebra, if $\mu$ is $H$-equivariant (and $u$ is also equivariant, or equivalently $\rho(h,1_A) = \epsilon(h) 1_A$). As special cases, Lie algebras, Lie superalgebras and groups can also have representations on an algebra.

== Comodules and Hopf modules ==
Dual to the notion of a representation or module of an algebra is that of a coreprepresentation or comodule of a coalgebra. Since Hopf algebras are bialgebras, they can have both modules and comodules, and as for modules, trivial comodules and tensor products and dual of comodules exist. If $H$ is a finite-dimensional Hopf algebra, its dual $H^*$ is also a Hopf algebra; $H$-modules are then $H^*$-modules and vice-versa. A weaker version of this statement holds for the infinite-dimensional case, where $H^*$ must be replaced with a smaller space $H^\circ$ called the finite dual.

A Hopf module for a Hopf algebra $H$ is a vector space which is both an $H$-module and an $H$-comodule satisfying the compatibility condition that the comodule map $\rho: M \to H\otimes M$ is $H$-equivariant. A fundamental result says that Hopf modules are free as ordinary modules; the utility of this fact is that it can be used to prove that a particular $H$-module is free.

== See also ==
- Tannaka–Krein reconstruction theorem
