= Yangian =

In representation theory, a Yangian is an infinite-dimensional Hopf algebra, a type of a quantum group. Yangians first appeared in physics in the work of Ludvig Faddeev and his school in the late 1970s and early 1980s concerning the quantum inverse scattering method. The name Yangian was introduced by Vladimir Drinfeld in 1985 in honor of C.N. Yang.

Initially, they were considered a convenient tool to generate the solutions of the quantum Yang–Baxter equation.

The center of the Yangian can be described by the quantum determinant.

The Yangian is a degeneration of the quantum loop algebra (i.e. the quantum affine algebra at vanishing central charge).

== Description ==
For any finite-dimensional semisimple Lie algebra a, Drinfeld defined an infinite-dimensional Hopf algebra Y(a), called the Yangian of a. This Hopf algebra is a deformation of the universal enveloping algebra U(a[z]) of the Lie algebra of polynomial loops of a given by explicit generators and relations. The relations can be encoded by identities involving a rational R-matrix. Replacing it with a trigonometric R-matrix, one arrives at affine quantum groups, defined in the same paper of Drinfeld.

In the case of the general linear Lie algebra gl_{N}, the Yangian admits a simpler description in terms of a single ternary (or RTT) relation on the matrix generators due to Faddeev and coauthors. The Yangian Y(gl_{N}) is defined to be the algebra generated by elements $t_{ij}^{(p)}$ with 1 ≤ i, j ≤ N and p ≥ 0, subject to the relations

$$[t_{ij}^{(p+1)}, t_{kl}^{(q)}] -  [t_{ij}^{(p)}, t_{kl}^{(q+1)}]= -(t_{kj}^{(p)}t_{il}^{(q)} - t_{kj}^{(q)} t_{il}^{(p)}).$$

Defining $t_{ij}^{(-1)}=\delta_{ij}$, setting

$$T(z) = \sum_{p\ge -1} t_{ij}^{(p)} z^{-p+1}$$

and introducing the R-matrix R(z) = I + z^{−1} P on C^{N}$\otimes$C^{N}, where P is the operator permuting the tensor factors, the above relations can be written more simply as the ternary relation:

$$\displaystyle{ R_{12}(z-w) T_{1}(z)T_{2}(w) = T_{2}(w) T_{1}(z) R_{12}(z-w).}$$

The Yangian becomes a Hopf algebra with comultiplication Δ, counit ε and antipode s given by

$$(\Delta \otimes \mathrm{id})T(z)=T_{12}(z)T_{13}(z), \,\, (\varepsilon\otimes \mathrm{id})T(z)= I, \,\, (s\otimes \mathrm{id})T(z)=T(z)^{-1}.$$

At special values of the spectral parameter $(z-w)$, the R-matrix degenerates to a rank one projection. This can be used to define the quantum determinant of $T(z)$, which generates the center of the Yangian.

The twisted Yangian Y^{−}(gl_{2N}), introduced by G. I. Olshansky, is the co-ideal generated by the coefficients of

$$\displaystyle{ S(z)=T(z)\sigma T(-z),}$$

where σ is the involution of gl_{2N} given by

$$\displaystyle{\sigma(E_{ij}) = (-1)^{i+j}E_{2N-j+1,2N-i+1}.}$$

== Applications ==
=== Classical representation theory ===
Grigori I. Olshansky and Ivan Cherednik discovered that the Yangian of gl_{N} is closely related with the branching properties of irreducible finite-dimensional representations of general linear algebras. In particular, the classical Gelfand–Tsetlin construction of a basis in the space of such a representation has a natural interpretation in the language of Yangians, studied by Maxim Nazarov and Vitaly Tarasov. Later Olshansky, Nazarov and Alexander Molev discovered a generalization of this theory to other classical Lie algebras, based on the twisted Yangian.

=== Physics ===
The Yangian appears as a symmetry group in different models in physics.

Yangian appears as a symmetry group of one-dimensional exactly solvable models such as spin chains, Hubbard model and in models of one-dimensional relativistic quantum field theory.

The most famous occurrence is in planar supersymmetric Yang–Mills theory in four dimensions, where Yangian structures appear on the level of symmetries of operators, and scattering amplitude as was discovered by James M. Drummond, Johannes Henn and Jan Plefka.

== Representation theory ==
Irreducible finite-dimensional representations of Yangians were parametrized by Drinfeld in a way similar to the highest weight theory in the representation theory of semisimple Lie algebras. The role of the highest weight is played by a finite set of Drinfeld polynomials. Drinfeld also discovered a generalization of the classical Schur–Weyl duality between representations of general linear and symmetric groups that involves the Yangian of sl_{N} and the degenerate affine Hecke algebra (graded Hecke algebra of type A, in George Lusztig's terminology).

Representations of Yangians have been extensively studied, but the theory is still under active development.

== See also ==
- Quantum affine algebra
