= Quasi-triangular quasi-Hopf algebra =

A quasi-triangular quasi-Hopf algebra is a specialized form of a quasi-Hopf algebra defined by the Ukrainian mathematician Vladimir Drinfeld in 1989. It is also a generalized form of a quasi-triangular Hopf algebra.

A quasi-triangular quasi-Hopf algebra is a set $\mathcal{H_A} = (\mathcal{A}, R, \Delta, \varepsilon, \Phi)$ where $\mathcal{B_A} = (\mathcal{A}, \Delta, \varepsilon, \Phi)$ is a quasi-Hopf algebra and $R \in \mathcal{A \otimes A}$ known as the R-matrix, is an invertible element such that

$$R \Delta(a) = \sigma \circ \Delta(a) R$$

for all $a \in \mathcal{A}$, where $\sigma\colon \mathcal{A \otimes A} \rightarrow \mathcal{A \otimes A}$ is the switch map given by $x \otimes y \rightarrow y \otimes x$, and

$$(\Delta \otimes \operatorname{id})R = \Phi_{231}R_{13}\Phi_{132}^{-1}R_{23}\Phi_{123}$$
$$(\operatorname{id} \otimes \Delta)R = \Phi_{312}^{-1}R_{13}\Phi_{213}R_{12}\Phi_{123}^{-1}$$

where $\Phi_{abc} = x_a \otimes x_b \otimes x_c$ and $\Phi_{123}= \Phi = x_1 \otimes x_2 \otimes x_3 \in \mathcal{A \otimes A \otimes A}$.

The quasi-Hopf algebra becomes triangular if in addition, $R_{21}R_{12}=1$.

The twisting of $\mathcal{H_A}$ by $F \in \mathcal{A \otimes A}$ is the same as for a quasi-Hopf algebra, with the additional definition of the twisted R-matrix

A quasi-triangular (resp. triangular) quasi-Hopf algebra with $\Phi=1$ is a quasi-triangular (resp. triangular) Hopf algebra as the latter two conditions in the definition reduce the conditions of quasi-triangularity of a Hopf algebra.

Similarly to the twisting properties of the quasi-Hopf algebra, the property of being quasi-triangular or triangular quasi-Hopf algebra is preserved by twisting.

== See also ==
- Ribbon Hopf algebra
