= Quantum affine algebra =

Mathematical discipline

In mathematics, a quantum affine algebra (or affine quantum group) is a Hopf algebra that is a q-deformation of the universal enveloping algebra of an affine Lie algebra. They were introduced independently by Drinfeld (1985) and Jimbo (1985) as a special case of their general construction of a quantum group from a Cartan matrix. One of their principal applications has been to the theory of solvable lattice models in quantum statistical mechanics, where the Yang–Baxter equation occurs with a spectral parameter. Combinatorial aspects of the representation theory of quantum affine algebras can be described simply using crystal bases, which correspond to the degenerate case when the deformation parameter q vanishes and the Hamiltonian of the associated lattice model can be explicitly diagonalized.

== See also ==
- Quantum enveloping algebra
- Quantum KZ equations
- Littelmann path model
- Yangian
