= Quasitriangular Hopf algebra =

Algebra with braided rigid category of representations

In mathematics, a quasitriangular Hopf algebra is a particular kind of Hopf algebra $H$, equipped with a special element $R\in H \otimes H$, called the R-matrix. The R-matrix naturally provides the structure of a braiding on the rigid category of representations of $H$, which makes quasitriangular Hopf algebras useful in knot theory.

The most important examples of quasitriangular Hopf algebras are quantum groups.

Quasitriangular Hopf algebras were introduced by Vladimir Drinfeld in the mid-1980s as part of his theory of quantum groups, in connection with the quantum Yang–Baxter equation. The universal R-matrix of such an algebra induces solutions of the quantum Yang–Baxter equation on its representations, with the Drinfeld–Jimbo quantum groups as the main examples.

== Definition ==
A Hopf algebra H is quasitriangular if there exists an invertible element $R\in H \otimes H$ such that

- $R \ \Delta(x)R^{-1} = (T \circ \Delta)(x)$ for all $x \in H$, where $\Delta$ is the coproduct on H, and the linear map $T : H \otimes H \to H \otimes H$ is given by $T(x \otimes y) = y \otimes x$,

- $(\Delta \otimes 1)(R) = R_{13} \ R_{23}$,

- $(1 \otimes \Delta)(R) = R_{13} \ R_{12}$,

where $R_{12} = \phi_{12}(R)$, $R_{13} = \phi_{13}(R)$, and $R_{23} = \phi_{23}(R)$, where $\phi_{12} : H \otimes H \to H \otimes H \otimes H$, $\phi_{13} : H \otimes H \to H \otimes H \otimes H$, and $\phi_{23} : H \otimes H \to H \otimes H \otimes H$, are algebra morphisms determined by

$$\phi_{12}(a \otimes b) = a \otimes b \otimes 1,$$

$$\phi_{13}(a \otimes b) = a \otimes 1 \otimes b,$$

$$\phi_{23}(a \otimes b) = 1 \otimes a \otimes b.$$

R is called the R-matrix.

== Properties ==
As a consequence of the properties of quasitriangularity, the R-matrix, R, is a solution of the Yang–Baxter equation (and so a module V of H can be used to determine quasi-invariants of braids, knots and links). Also as a consequence of the properties of quasitriangularity, $(\epsilon \otimes 1) R = (1 \otimes \epsilon) R = 1 \in H$; moreover $R^{-1} = (S \otimes 1)(R)$, $R = (1 \otimes S)(R^{-1})$, and $(S \otimes S)(R) = R$. One may further show that the antipode S must be a linear isomorphism, and thus S^{2} is an automorphism. In fact, S^{2} is given by conjugating by an invertible element: $S^2(x)= u x u^{-1}$ where $u := m ((S \otimes 1) \circ T)R$ (cf. Ribbon Hopf algebras).

It is possible to construct a quasitriangular Hopf algebra from a Hopf algebra and its dual, using the Drinfeld quantum double construction.

If the Hopf algebra H is quasitriangular, then the category of modules over H is braided with braiding

$$c_{U,V}(u\otimes v) = T \left( R \cdot (u \otimes v )\right) = T \left( R_1 u \otimes R_2 v\right)$$.

== Twisting ==
The property of being a quasi-triangular Hopf algebra is preserved by twisting via an invertible element $F = \sum_i f^i \otimes f_i \in \mathcal{A \otimes A}$ such that $(\varepsilon \otimes id )F = (id \otimes \varepsilon)F = 1$ and satisfying the cocycle condition

$$(F \otimes 1) \cdot (\Delta \otimes id)( F) = (1 \otimes F) \cdot (id \otimes \Delta)( F)$$

Furthermore, $u = \sum_i f^i S(f_i)$ is invertible and the twisted antipode is given by $S'(a) = u S(a)u^{-1}$, with the twisted comultiplication, R-matrix and co-unit change according to those defined for the quasi-triangular quasi-Hopf algebra. Such a twist is known as an admissible (or Drinfeld) twist.

== See also ==
- Quasi-triangular quasi-Hopf algebra
- Ribbon Hopf algebra
