= Ribbon Hopf algebra =

Algebraic structure

A ribbon Hopf algebra $(A,\nabla, \eta,\Delta,\varepsilon,S,\mathcal{R},\nu)$ is a quasitriangular Hopf algebra which possess an invertible central element $\nu$ more commonly known as the ribbon element, such that the following conditions hold:

$$\nu^{2}=uS(u), \; S(\nu)=\nu, \; \varepsilon (\nu)=1$$
$$\Delta (\nu)=(\mathcal{R}_{21}\mathcal{R}_{12})^{-1}(\nu \otimes \nu )$$

where $u=\nabla(S\otimes \text{id})(\mathcal{R}_{21})$. Note that the element u exists for any quasitriangular Hopf algebra, and $uS(u)$ must always be central and satisfies $S(uS(u))=uS(u), \varepsilon(uS(u))=1, \Delta(uS(u)) = (\mathcal{R}_{21}\mathcal{R}_{12})^{-2}(uS(u) \otimes uS(u))$, so that all that is required is that it have a central square root with the above properties.

Here

$A$ is a vector space
$\nabla$ is the multiplication map $\nabla:A \otimes A \rightarrow A$
$\Delta$ is the co-product map $\Delta: A \rightarrow A \otimes A$
$\eta$ is the unit operator $\eta:\mathbb{C} \rightarrow A$
$\varepsilon$ is the co-unit operator $\varepsilon: A \rightarrow \mathbb{C}$
$S$ is the antipode $S: A\rightarrow A$
$\mathcal{R}$ is a universal R matrix

We assume that the underlying field $K$ is $\mathbb{C}$

If $A$ is finite-dimensional, one could equivalently call it ribbon Hopf if and only if its category of (say, left) modules is ribbon; if $A$ is finite-dimensional and quasi-triangular, then it is ribbon if and only if its category of (say, left) modules is pivotal.

== See also ==
- Quasitriangular Hopf algebra
- Quasi-triangular quasi-Hopf algebra
