= R-matrix =

The term R-matrix has several meanings, depending on the field of study. Its original use has been to mathematically describe nuclear reactions. In particular the general problem of nuclear reactions is to relate the values of the scattering or collision matrix elements (which in principle can be obtained from measurements) to the (slow) dynamics of nuclear structure. The R-matrix formalism describes the effects of the interaction of the nucleus with the outside world. Its interior is not specified, i.e. it is considered a "black box". The original formulations of the theory came from nuclear scientists Wigner, Eisenbud, Breit, Blatt, Weisskopf, and others. Related theories are U-matrix, S-matrix, by M-matrix, or T-matrix.

== Other meanings and uses ==
The term R-matrix is used in connection with the Yang–Baxter equation, first introduced in the field of statistical mechanics in the works of J. B. McGuire in 1964 and C. N. Yang in 1967 and in the group algebra $\mathbb{C} [S_n]$ of the symmetric group in the work of A. A. Jucys in 1966. The classical R-matrix arises in the definition of the classical Yang–Baxter equation.

In quasitriangular Hopf algebra, the R-matrix is a solution of the Yang–Baxter equation.

The numerical modeling of diffraction gratings in optical science can be performed using the R-matrix propagation algorithm.

== R-matrix method in quantum mechanics ==
There is a method in computational quantum mechanics for studying scattering known as the R-matrix. Using the original R-matrix theory as a basis, a method was developed for electron, positron and photon scattering by atoms. This approach was later adapted for electron, positron and photon scattering by molecules.

== Other applications ==
R-matrix method is used in UKRmol and UKRmol+ code suits. The user-friendly software Quantemol Electron Collisions (Quantemol-EC) and its predecessor Quantemol-N are based on UKRmol/UKRmol+ and employ MOLPRO package for electron configuration calculations.

== See also ==
- Compound nucleus
- Distorted Waves Born Approximation
- Optical model
