= Yang–Baxter equation =

Quantum consistency equation

In physics, the Yang–Baxter equation (or star–triangle relation) is a consistency equation which was first introduced in the field of statistical mechanics. It depends on the idea that in some scattering situations, particles may preserve their momentum while changing their quantum internal states. It states that a matrix $R$, acting on two out of three objects, satisfies

$$(\check{R}\otimes \mathbf{1})(\mathbf{1}\otimes \check{R})(\check{R}\otimes \mathbf{1}) =(\mathbf{1}\otimes \check{R})(\check{R} \otimes \mathbf{1})(\mathbf{1}\otimes \check{R}),$$

where $\check{R}$ is $R$ followed by a swap of the two objects. In one-dimensional quantum systems, $R$ is the scattering matrix and if it satisfies the Yang–Baxter equation then the system is integrable. In quantum integrable models, the Yang–Baxter equation ensures that multi-particle scattering processes can be factorized into a sequence of two-body interactions, preserving exact solvability. The Yang–Baxter equation also shows up when discussing knot theory and the braid groups where $R$ corresponds to swapping two strands. Since one can swap three strands in two different ways, the Yang–Baxter equation ensures that both paths are the same.

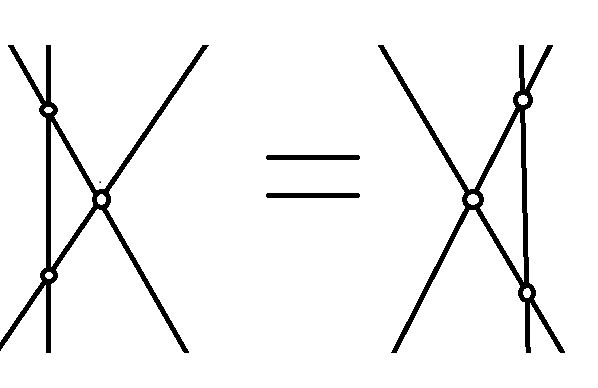
Illustration of the Yang–Baxter equation

== History ==
According to Michio Jimbo, the Yang–Baxter equation (YBE) manifested itself in the works of J. B. McGuire in 1964 and C. N. Yang in 1967. They considered a quantum mechanical many-body problem on a line having $c\sum_{i<j}\delta(x_i - x_j)$ as the potential. Using the Bethe ansatz techniques, they found that the scattering matrix factorized to that of the two-body problem, and determined it exactly. This result established the Yang–Baxter equation as the defining criterion for quantum integrability, linking factorized scattering in one dimension to exactly solvable models. Here the YBE arises as the consistency condition for the factorization.

In statistical mechanics, the source of the YBE probably goes back to Onsager's star-triangle relation, briefly mentioned in the introduction to his solution of the Ising model in 1944. The hunt for solvable lattice models has been actively pursued since then, culminating in Rodney Baxter's solution of the eight vertex model in 1972.

Another line of development was the theory of factorized S-matrix in two dimensional quantum field theory. Alexander B. Zamolodchikov pointed out that the algebraic mechanics working here is the same as that in the Baxter's and others' works.

The YBE has also manifested itself in a study of Young operators in the group algebra $\mathbb{C} [S_n]$ of the symmetric group in the work of A. A. Jucys in 1966.

== General form of the parameter-dependent Yang–Baxter equation ==
Let $A$ be a unital associative algebra. In its most general form, the parameter-dependent Yang–Baxter equation is an equation for $R(u,u')$, a parameter-dependent element of the tensor product $A \otimes A$ (here, $u$ and $u'$ are the parameters, which usually range over the real numbers ℝ in the case of an additive parameter, or over positive real numbers ℝ^{+} in the case of a multiplicative parameter).

Let $R_{ij}(u,u') = \phi_{ij}(R(u,u'))$ for $1\le i< j \le3$, with algebra homomorphisms $\phi_{ij} : A \otimes A \to A \otimes A \otimes A$ determined by

$$\phi_{12}(a \otimes b) = a \otimes b \otimes 1,$$

$$\phi_{13}(a \otimes b) = a \otimes 1 \otimes b,$$

$$\phi_{23}(a \otimes b) = 1 \otimes a \otimes b.$$

The general form of the Yang–Baxter equation is

$$R_{12}(u_1,u_2) \ R_{13}(u_1,u_3) \ R_{23}(u_2,u_3) = R_{23}(u_2,u_3) \ R_{13}(u_1,u_3) \ R_{12}(u_1,u_2),$$

for all values of $u_1$, $u_2$ and $u_3$.

=== Parameter-independent form ===
Let $A$ be a unital associative algebra. The parameter-independent Yang–Baxter equation is an equation for $R$, an invertible element of the tensor product $A \otimes A$. The Yang–Baxter equation is

$$R_{12} \ R_{13} \ R_{23} = R_{23} \ R_{13} \ R_{12},$$

where $R_{12} = \phi_{12}(R)$, $R_{13} = \phi_{13}(R)$, and $R_{23} = \phi_{23}(R)$.

=== With respect to a basis ===
Often the unital associative algebra is the algebra of endomorphisms of a vector space $V$ over a field $k$, that is, $A = \text{End}(V)$. With respect to a basis $\{e_i\}$ of $V$, the components of the matrices $R\in \text{End}(V)\otimes\text{End}(V) \cong \text{End}(V\otimes V)$ are written $R_{ij}^{kl}$, which is the component associated to the map $e_i\otimes e_j \mapsto e_k\otimes e_l$. Omitting parameter dependence, the component of the Yang–Baxter equation associated to the map $e_a\otimes e_b\otimes e_c \mapsto e_d \otimes e_e \otimes e_f$ reads

$$(R_{12})_{ij}^{de}(R_{13})_{ak}^{if}(R_{23})_{bc}^{jk} = (R_{23})_{jk}^{ef} (R_{13})_{ic}^{dk} (R_{12})_{ab}^{ij}.$$

== Alternate form and representations of the braid group ==
Let $V$ be a module of $A$, and $P_{ij} = \phi_{ij}(P)$ . Let $P : V \otimes V \to V \otimes V$ be the linear map satisfying $P(x \otimes y) = y \otimes x$ for all $x, y \in V$. The Yang–Baxter equation then has the following alternate form in terms of $\check{R}(u,u') = P \circ R(u,u')$ on $V \otimes V$.

$$(\mathbf{1} \otimes \check{R}(u_1,u_2)) (\check{R}(u_1,u_3)  \otimes \mathbf{1})(\mathbf{1}\otimes \check{R}(u_2,u_3)) =  (\check{R}(u_2,u_3) \otimes \mathbf{1}) ( \mathbf{1}\otimes \check{R}(u_1,u_3) )  ( \check{R}(u_1,u_2) \otimes \mathbf{1}).$$

Alternatively, we can express it in the same notation as above, defining $\check{R}_{ij}(u,u') = \phi_{ij}(\check{R}(u,u'))$ , in which case the alternate form is

$$\check{R}_{23}(u_1,u_2) \ \check{R}_{12}(u_1,u_3) \ \check{R}_{23}(u_2,u_3) = \check{R}_{12}(u_2,u_3) \ \check{R}_{23}(u_1,u_3) \ \check{R}_{12}(u_1,u_2).$$

In the parameter-independent special case where $\check{R}$ does not depend on parameters, the equation reduces to

$$(\mathbf{1}\otimes \check{R})(\check{R} \otimes \mathbf{1})(\mathbf{1}\otimes \check{R}) = (\check{R}\otimes \mathbf{1})(\mathbf{1}\otimes \check{R})(\check{R}\otimes \mathbf{1}),$$

and (if $R$ is invertible) a representation of the braid group, $B_n$, can be constructed on $V^{\otimes n}$ by $\sigma_i = 1^{\otimes i-1} \otimes \check{R} \otimes 1^{\otimes n-i-1}$ for $i = 1,\dots,n-1$. This representation can be used to determine quasi-invariants of braids, knots and links.

== Symmetry ==
Solutions to the Yang–Baxter equation are often constrained by requiring the $R$ matrix to be invariant under the action of a Lie group $G$. For example, in the case $G = GL(V)$ and $R(u,u')\in \text{End}(V\otimes V)$, the only $G$-invariant maps in $\text{End}(V\otimes V)$ are the identity $I$ and the permutation map $P$. The general form of the $R$-matrix is then $R(u, u') = A(u,u')I + B(u, u')P$ for scalar functions $A, B$.

The Yang–Baxter equation is homogeneous in parameter dependence in the sense that if one defines $R'(u_i, u_j) = f(u_i, u_j)R(u_i,u_j)$, where $f$ is a scalar function, then $R'$ also satisfies the Yang–Baxter equation.

The argument space itself may have symmetry. For example translation invariance enforces that the dependence on the arguments $(u, u')$ must be dependent only on the translation-invariant difference $u-u'$, while scale invariance enforces that $R$ is a function of the scale-invariant ratio $u/u'$.

== Parametrizations and example solutions ==
A common ansatz for computing solutions is the difference property, $R(u,u') = R(u - u')$ , where R depends only on a single (additive) parameter. Equivalently, taking logarithms, we may choose the parametrization $R(u,u') = R(u/u')$ , in which case R is said to depend on a multiplicative parameter. In those cases, we may reduce the YBE to two free parameters in a form that facilitates computations:

$$R_{12}(u) \ R_{13}(u+v) \ R_{23}(v) = R_{23}(v) \ R_{13}(u+v) \ R_{12}(u),$$

for all values of $u$ and $v$. For a multiplicative parameter, the Yang–Baxter equation is

$$R_{12}(u) \ R_{13}(uv) \ R_{23}(v) = R_{23}(v) \ R_{13}(uv) \ R_{12}(u),$$

for all values of $u$ and $v$.

The braided forms read as:

$$(\mathbf{1}\otimes \check{R}(u)) (\check{R}(u + v)  \otimes \mathbf{1})  (\mathbf{1}\otimes \check{R}(v)) = (\check{R}(v) \otimes \mathbf{1}) (\mathbf{1}\otimes \check{R}(u + v))(\check{R}(u) \otimes \mathbf{1} )$$
$$(\mathbf{1}\otimes \check{R}(u)) (\check{R}(uv)  \otimes \mathbf{1})  (\mathbf{1}\otimes \check{R}(v)) = (\check{R}(v) \otimes \mathbf{1}) (\mathbf{1}\otimes \check{R}(uv))(\check{R}(u) \otimes \mathbf{1} )$$

In some cases, the determinant of $R (u)$ can vanish at specific values of the spectral parameter $u=u_{0}$. Some $R$ matrices turn into a one dimensional projector at $u=u_{0}$. In this case a quantum determinant can be defined.

=== Example solutions of the parameter-dependent YBE ===
- A particularly simple class of parameter-dependent solutions can be obtained from solutions of the parameter-independent YBE satisfying $\check{R}^2 = \mathbf{1}$, where the corresponding braid group representation is a permutation group representation. In this case, $\check{R}(u) = \mathbf{1} + u \check{R}$ (equivalently, $R(u) = P + u P \circ \check{R}$ ) is a solution of the (additive) parameter-dependent YBE. In the case where $\check{R} = P$ and $R(u) = P + u \mathbf{1}$ , this gives the scattering matrix of the Heisenberg XXX spin chain.
- The $R$-matrices of the evaluation modules of the quantum group $U_q(\widehat{sl}(2))$ are given explicitly by the matrix

$$\check{R}(z) = \begin{pmatrix}
q z - q^{-1}z^{-1} & & & \\
& q-q^{-1} & z-z^{-1} &\\
& z-z^{-1} & q-q^{-1} &\\
& & & q z - q^{-1}z^{-1}
\end{pmatrix}.$$
Then the parametrized Yang–Baxter equation (in braided form) with the multiplicative parameter is satisfied:
$$(\mathbf{1}\otimes\check{R}(z)) (\check{R}(zz')  \otimes \mathbf{1})  (\mathbf{1}\otimes \check{R}(z')) = (\check{R}(z') \otimes \mathbf{1}) (\mathbf{1}\otimes \check{R}(zz'))(\check{R}(z) \otimes \mathbf{1} )$$

=== Classification of solutions ===
There are broadly speaking three classes of solutions: rational, trigonometric and elliptic. These are related to quantum groups known as the Yangian, affine quantum groups and elliptic algebras respectively.

== Set-theoretic Yang–Baxter equation ==
Set-theoretic solutions were studied by Drinfeld. In this case, there is an $R$-matrix invariant basis $X$ for the vector space $V$ in the sense that the $R$-matrix maps the induced basis of $V\otimes V$ to itself. This then induces a map $r: X\times X \rightarrow X\times X$ given by restriction of the $R$-matrix to the basis. The set-theoretic Yang–Baxter equation is then defined using the 'twisted' alternate form above, asserting
$$(id\times r)(r\times id)(id\times r) = (r\times id)(id\times r)(r \times id)$$
as maps on $X\times X\times X$. The equation can then be considered purely as an equation in the category of sets.

=== Examples ===
- $R = id$.
- $R = \tau$ where $\tau(u\otimes v) = v\otimes u$, the transposition map.
- If $(X, \triangleleft)$ is a (right) shelf, then $r(x,y) = (y, x \triangleleft y)$ is a set-theoretic solution to the YBE.

== Classical Yang–Baxter equation ==
Solutions to the classical YBE were studied and to some extent classified by Belavin and Drinfeld. Given a 'classical $r$-matrix' $r: V\otimes V \rightarrow V\otimes V$, which may also depend on a pair of arguments $(u, v)$, the classical YBE is (suppressing parameters)
$$[r_{12}, r_{13}] + [r_{12}, r_{23}] + [r_{13}, r_{23}] = 0$$
This is quadratic in the $r$-matrix, unlike the usual quantum YBE which is cubic in $R$.

This equation emerges from so called quasi-classical solutions to the quantum YBE, in which the $R$-matrix admits an asymptotic expansion in terms of an expansion parameter $\hbar,$
$$R_\hbar = I + \hbar r + \mathcal{O}(\hbar^2).$$
The classical YBE then comes from reading off the $\hbar^2$ coefficient of the quantum YBE (and the equation trivially holds at orders $\hbar^0, \hbar$).

== See also ==
- Lie bialgebra
- Yangian
- Reidemeister move
- Quasitriangular Hopf algebra
- Yang–Baxter operator
