= Hall word =

Construction providing a total order on a free monoid

In mathematics, in the areas of group theory and combinatorics, Hall words provide a unique monoid factorisation of the free monoid. They are also totally ordered, and thus provide a total order on the monoid. This is analogous to the better-known case of Lyndon words; in fact, the Lyndon words are a special case, and almost all properties possessed by Lyndon words carry over to Hall words. Hall words are in one-to-one correspondence with Hall trees. These are binary trees; taken together, they form the Hall set. This set is a particular totally ordered subset of a free non-associative algebra, that is, a free magma. In this form, the Hall trees provide a basis for free Lie algebras, and can be used to perform the commutations required by the Poincaré–Birkhoff–Witt theorem used in the construction of a universal enveloping algebra. As such, this generalizes the same process when done with the Lyndon words. Hall trees can also be used to give a total order to the elements of a group, via the commutator collecting process, which is a special case of the general construction given below. It can be shown that Lazard sets coincide with Hall sets.

The historical development runs in reverse order from the above description. The commutator collecting process was described first, in 1934, by Philip Hall and explored in 1937 by Wilhelm Magnus. Hall sets were introduced by Marshall Hall based on work of Philip Hall on groups. Subsequently, Wilhelm Magnus showed that they arise as the graded Lie algebra associated with the filtration on a free group given by the lower central series. This correspondence was motivated by commutator identities in group theory due to Philip Hall and Ernst Witt.

== Notational preliminaries ==
The setting for this article is the free magma in $n$ generators. This is simply a set containing $n$ elements, along with a binary operator $\bullet$ that allows any two elements to be juxtaposed, next to each other. The juxtaposition is taken to be non-associative and non-commutative, so that parenthesis must necessarily be used, when juxtaposing three or more elements. Thus, for example, $(a\bullet b) \bullet c$ is not the same as $a\bullet (b \bullet c)$.

In this way, the magma operator $\bullet$ provides a convenient stand-in for any other desired binary operator that might have additional properties, such as group or algebra commutators. Thus, for example, the magma juxtaposition can be mapped to the commutator of a non-commutative algebra:

$$a\bullet b \mapsto [a,b]=ab-ba$$

or to a group commutator:

$$a\bullet b \mapsto aba^{-1}b^{-1}$$

The above two maps are just magma homomorphisms, in the conventional sense of a homomorphism; the objects on the right just happen to have more structure than a magma does. To avoid the awkward typographical mess that is $\bullet$, it is conventional to just write $ab$ for $(a\bullet b)$. The use of parenthesis is mandatory, however, since $(ab)c\ne a(bc)$ as already noted. If $a$ is a compound object, one might sometimes write $(a)$ as needed, to disambiguate usage. Of course, one can also write $[a,b]$ in place of $ab$, but this can lead to a proliferation of square brackets and commas. Keeping this in mind, one can otherwise be fluid in the notation.

== Hall set ==
The Hall set is a totally ordered subset of a free non-associative algebra, that is, a free magma. Let $A=\{a_1,\ldots,a_n\}$ be a set of generators, and let $M(A)$ be the free magma over $A$. The free magma is simply the set of non-associative strings in the letters of $A$, with parenthesis retained to show grouping. Parenthesis may be written with square brackets, so that elements of the free magma may be viewed as formal commutators. Equivalently, the free magma is the set of all binary trees with leaves marked by elements of $A$.

The Hall set $H\subseteq M(A)$ can be constructed recursively (in increasing order) as follows:

- The elements of $A$ are given an arbitrary total order.
- The Hall set contains the generators: $A\subseteq H.$
- A formal commutator $[x,y]\in H$ if and only if $x\in H$ and $y\in H$ and $x>y$ and:
  - Either $x\in A$ (and thus $y\in A$),
  - Or $x=[u,v]$ with $u\in H$ and $v\in H$ and $v\le y$.
- The commutators can be ordered arbitrarily, provided that $y < [x,y]$ always holds.

The construction and notation used below are nearly identical to that used in the commutator collecting process, and so can be directly compared; the weights are the string-lengths. The difference is that no mention of groups is required. These definitions all coincide with that of X. Viennot. Note that some authors reverse the order of the inequality. Note also that one of the conditions, the $v\le y$, may feel "backwards"; this "backwardness" is what provides the descending order required for factorization. Reversing the inequality does not reverse this "backwardness".

=== Example ===
Consider the generating set with two elements $\{a,b\}.$ Define $a>b$ and write $xy$ for $[x,y]$ to simplify notation, using parenthesis only as needed. The initial members of the Hall set are then (in order)

$$\begin{align}
&b, a, \\
&ab, \\
&(ab)b, \;\;(ab)a, \\
&((ab)b)b, \;\;((ab)b)a,\;\; ((ab)a)a, \\
&(((ab)b)b)b, \; (((ab)b)b)a, \; (((ab)b)a)a, \; (((ab)a)a)a,\; ((ab)b)(ab),\; ((ab)a)(ab), \\
& \cdots
\end{align}$$

Notice that there are $2,1,2,3,6,\ldots$ elements of each distinct length. This is the beginning sequence of the necklace polynomial in two elements (described next, below).

=== Combinatorics ===
A basic result is that the number of elements of length $k$ in the Hall set (over $n$ generators) is given by the necklace polynomial

$$M_n(k) \ =\ {1\over k}\sum_{d\,|\,k}\mu\!\left({k \over d}\right)n^d = {1\over k}\sum_{d\,|\,k}\mu\!\left({d}\right)n^{k/d}$$

where $\mu$ is the classic Möbius function. The sum is a Dirichlet convolution.

=== Definitions and Lemmas ===
Some basic definitions are useful. Given a tree $t=[x,y]$, the element $x$ is called the immediate left subtree, and likewise, $y$ is the immediate right subtree. A right subtree is either $y$ itself, or a right subtree of either $x$ or $y$. An extreme right subtree is either $y$ itself or an extreme right subtree of $y$.

A basic lemma is that if $v$ is a right subtree of a Hall tree $t=[x,y]$, then $v\le y.$

== Hall words ==
Hall words are obtained from the Hall set by "forgetting" the commutator brackets, but otherwise keeping the notion of total order. It turns out that this "forgetting" is harmless, as the corresponding Hall tree can be deduced from the word, and it is unique. That is, the Hall words are in one-to-one correspondence with the Hall trees. The total order on the Hall trees passes over to a total order on the Hall words.

This correspondence allows a monoid factorisation: given the free monoid $A^*$, any element of $A^*$ can be uniquely factorized into a ascending sequence of Hall words. This is analogous to, and generalizes the better-known case of factorization with Lyndon words provided by the Chen–Fox–Lyndon theorem.

More precisely, every word $w\in A^*$ can be written as a concatenation of Hall words

$$w=h_1h_2\cdots h_k$$

with each Hall word $h_j$ being totally ordered by the Hall ordering:

$$h_1\le h_2\le\cdots\le h_k.$$

In this way, the Hall word ordering extends to a total order on the monoid. The lemmas and theorems required to provide the word-to-tree correspondence, and the unique ordering, are sketched below.

=== Foliage ===
The foliage of a magma $M(A)$ is the canonical mapping $f:M(A)\to A^*$ from the magma to the free monoid $A^*$, given by $f:a\mapsto a$ for $a\in A$ and $f:[x,y]\mapsto f(x)f(y)$ otherwise. The foliage is just the string consisting of the leaves of the tree, that is, taking the tree written with commutator brackets, and erasing the commutator brackets.

=== Factorization of Hall words ===
Let $t=[x,y]\in H$ be a Hall tree, and $w=f([x,y])$ be the corresponding Hall word. Given any factorization of a Hall word $w=uv$ into two non-empty strings $u$ and $v$, then there exists a factorization into Hall trees such that $u=f(x_1)\cdots f(x_m)$ and $v=f(y_1)\cdots f(y_n)$ with

$$x_1,\ldots ,x_m > y_1$$

and

$$y_1 \le y_2 \le \cdots \le y_n \le y.$$

This and the subsequent development below are given by Guy Melançon.

=== Correspondence ===
The converse to the above factorization establishes the correspondence between Hall words and Hall trees. This can be stated in the following interesting form: if $t$ is a Hall tree, and the corresponding Hall word $f(t)$ factorizes as

$$f(t)=f(t_1)\cdots f(t_n)$$

with

$$f(t_1)\le \cdots \le f(t_n)$$

then $n=1$. In other words, Hall words cannot be factored into a descending sequence of other Hall words. This implies that, given a Hall word, the corresponding tree can be uniquely identified.

=== Standard factorization ===
The total order on Hall trees passes over to Hall words. Thus, given a Hall word $w=f([x,y])$, it can be factorized as $w=f(x)f(y)$ with $f(x)>f(y)$. This is termed the standard factorization.

=== Standard sequence ===
A sequence of Hall words $(w_1, w_2, \ldots, w_n)$ is said to be a standard sequence if each $w_i$ is either a letter, or a standard factorization $w_i=u_iv_i$ with $v_i\le w_{i+1},\cdots, w_n.$ Note that increasing sequences of Hall words are standard.

=== Term rewriting ===
The unique factorization of any word $w\in A^*$ into a concatenation of an ascending sequence of Hall words $w=h_1h_2\cdots h_k$ with $h_1\le h_2\le\cdots\le h_k$ can be achieved by defining and recursively applying a simple term rewriting system. The uniqueness of the factorization follows from the confluence properties of the system. The rewriting is performed by the exchange of certain pairs of consecutive Hall words in a sequence; it is given after these definitions.

A drop in a sequence $(h_1, h_2, \ldots, h_n)$ of Hall words is a pair $(h_i, h_{i+1})$ such that $h_i > h_{i+1}.$ If the sequence is a standard sequence, then the drop is termed a legal drop if one also has that $h_{i+1}\le h_{i+2},\ldots,h_n.$

Given a standard sequence with a legal drop, there are two distinct rewrite rules that create new standard sequences. One concatenates the two words in the drop:

$$(h_1, h_2, \ldots, h_n)\to (h_1, h_2, \ldots, h_ih_{i+1}, \ldots, h_n)$$

while the other permutes the two elements in the drop:

$$(h_1, h_2, \ldots, h_n)\to (h_1, h_2, \ldots, h_{i-1}, h_{i+1}, h_i, h_{i+2}, \ldots, h_n)$$

It is not hard to show that both rewrites result in a new standard sequence. In general, it is most convenient to apply the rewrite to the right-most legal drop; however, it can be shown that the rewrite is confluent, and so one obtains the same results no matter what the order.

=== Total order ===
A total order can be provided on the words $w\in A^*.$ This is similar to the standard lexicographic order, but at the level of Hall words. Given two words $u, v$ factored into ascending Hall word order, i. e. that

$u=u_1u_2\cdots u_m\quad$ and $\quad v=v_1v_2\cdots v_n$

with each $u_i, v_j$ a Hall word, one has an ordering that $u<v$ if either

$m<n\quad$ and $\quad u_1=v_1,\,u_2=v_2,\,\cdots, u_m=v_m$

or if

$u_1=v_1,\,u_2=v_2,\,\ldots, u_k=v_k\quad$ and $\quad u_{k+1}<v_{k+1}.$

== Properties ==
Hall words have a number of curious properties, many of them nearly identical to those for Lyndon words. The first and most important property is that Lyndon words are a special case of Hall words. That is, the definition of a Lyndon word satisfies the definition of the Hall word. This can be readily verified by direct comparison; note that the direction of the inequality used in the definitions above is exactly the reverse of that used in the customary definition for Lyndon words. The set of Lyndon trees (which follow from the standard factorization) is a Hall set.

Other properties include:

- Hall words are acyclic, also known as primitive. That is, they cannot be written in the form $w=x^n$ for some word $x\in A^*$ and $n>1$.
- A word $w\in A^*$ is a Hall word if and only if for any factorization of $w=uv$ into non-empty words obeys $w > vu$. In particular, this implies that no Hall word is a conjugate of another Hall word. Note again, this is exactly as it is for a Lyndon word: Lyndon words are the least of their conjugacy class; Hall words are the greatest.
- A word $w\in A^*$ is a Hall word if and only if it is larger than any of its proper right factors. This follows from the previous two points.
- Every primitive word $w\in A^*$ is conjugate to a Hall word. That is, there exists a circular shift of $w$ that is a Hall word. Equivalently, there exists a factorization $w=uv$ such that $vu$ is a Hall word. This conjugate is unique, since no Hall word is a conjugate of another Hall word.
- Every word $w\in A^*$ is the conjugate of a power of a unique Hall word.

== Implications ==
There is a similar term rewriting system for Lyndon words, this is how the factorization of a monoid is accomplished with Lyndon words.

Because the Hall words can be placed into Hall trees, and each Hall tree can be interpreted as a commutator, the term rewrite can be used to perform the commutator collecting process on a group.

Another very important application of the rewrite rule is to perform the commutations that appear in the Poincaré–Birkhoff–Witt theorem. A detailed discussion of the commutation is provided in the article on universal enveloping algebras. Note that term rewriting with Lyndon words can also be used to obtain the needed commutation for the PBW theorem.

== History ==
Hall sets were introduced by Marshall Hall based on work of Philip Hall on groups. Subsequently, Wilhelm Magnus showed that they arise as the graded Lie algebra associated with the filtration on a free group given by the lower central series. This correspondence was motivated by commutator identities in group theory due to Philip Hall and Ernst Witt.

== See also ==
- Hall–Petresco identity
- Markov odometer
