= Cyclotomic identity =

Expresses 1/(1-az) as an infinite product using Moreau's necklace-counting function

In mathematics, the cyclotomic identity states that

$${1 \over 1-k z}=\prod_{j=1}^\infty\left({1 \over 1-z^j}\right)^{M_j(k)}$$

where M is Moreau's necklace-counting function,

$$M_n(k)={1\over n}\sum_{d\,|\,n}\mu\!\left({n \over d}\right)k^d,$$

and μ is the classic Möbius function of number theory.

The name comes from the denominator, 1 − z^{j}, which is the product of cyclotomic polynomials.

The left hand side of the cyclotomic identity is the generating function for the free associative algebra on k generators, and the right hand side is the generating function for the universal enveloping algebra of the free Lie algebra on k generators. The cyclotomic identity witnesses the fact that these two algebras are isomorphic.

Another interpretation is as the Hasse–Weil zeta function of the affine line over the finite field $\mathbb F_q$ with $k = q$ elements. The exponent $M_n(k)$ counts the number of number of maximal ideals of degree n in the coordinate ring $\mathbb F_q[x]$, i.e. the number of monic irreducible polynomials of degree n.

There is also a symmetric generalization of the cyclotomic identity found by Strehl:

$$\prod_{j=1}^\infty\left({1 \over 1-k z^j}\right)^{M_j(\ell)}
=\prod_{j=1}^\infty\left({1 \over 1-\ell z^j}\right)^{M_j(k)}$$
