= Anatoly Shirshov =

Soviet mathematician (1921–1981)

Anatoly Illarionovich Shirshov (Russian: Анато́лий Илларио́нович Ширшо́в; 8 August 1921, Kolyvan – 28 February 1981, Novosibirsk) was a Soviet mathematician, known for his research on free Lie algebras. He proved the Shirshov–Witt theorem, which states that any Lie subalgebra of a free Lie algebra is itself a free Lie algebra.

== Life ==
Anatoly was born on the 8th of August 1921 in the village Kolyvan near Novosibirsk. In 1939 he graduated from secondary school in the city of Aleysk of the Altai Territory and in the same year entered Tomsk University. After the first year, he transferred to the correspondence ("distance education" or "learning by mail") department and worked as a mathematics teacher in Aleysk. One of the streets of Aleisk is named after Anatoly Shirshov. In 1942 A. I. Shirshov volunteered for the front as part of 6th Rifle Corps of Siberian Volunteers. He fought on the West, Kalininsky, and 2nd Belorussian Fronts. He was awarded the medal of the Front Order on the 2nd Belorussian Front, No. 0813 dated 07/16/1945, "For Military Merit".

Beginning in 1946 A. I. Shirshov worked at the Stanichno-Luhansk secondary school in the Luhansk Oblast and studied in the correspondence department of Voroshilovgrad Pedagogical Institute, graduating there in 1949. In 1950 Shirshov was accepted as a graduate student at Moscow State University under the supervision of A. G. Kurosh. In 1953 Shirshov introduced the concept of "regular words", now called Lyndon words after Roger Lyndon, who published the idea in 1954. In 1958 A. I. Shirshov defended his higher doctoral dissertation On some classes of rings that are nearly associative and received his Russian Doctorate of Sciences degree.

From 1960 until his death A. I. Shirshov worked at the Sobolev Institute of Mathematics, while being a professor at Novosibirsk State University. From 1960 to 1974 he was deputy director of the Sobolev Institute of Mathematics. He was also the head of the department of algebra from 1960 until his death.

He was elected a corresponding member of the Academy of Sciences of the Soviet Union in 1964.

== Scientific contribution ==
Anatoly Shirshov was a pioneer in several directions of associative, Lie, Jordan, and alternative algebras, as well as groups and projective planes. His name is associated with notions and results on Gröbner–Shirshov bases, the Composition-Diamond Lemma, the Shirshov–Witt Theorem, the Lazard–Shirshov elimination process, Shirshov's Height Theorem, Lyndon–Shirshov words, Hall–Shirshov bases, Shirshov's Theorem on the Kurosh problem for alternative and Jordan algebras, and Shirshov's Theorem on the speciality of Jordan algebras with two generators. Shirshov's ideas were used by his student Efim Zelmanov for the solution of the Restricted Burnside problem.
