= Charles Moreau =

Charles Moreau may refer to:

- Charles Paul Narcisse Moreau (1837–1916), French soldier and mathematician
- Charles Moreau (cyclist) (born 1982), Canadian Paralympic cyclist
