= Hall's identity =

In mathematics, Hall's identity may be:

- The Hall–Witt identity $[x, y^{-1}, z]^y\cdot[y, z^{-1}, x]^z\cdot[z, x^{-1}, y]^x = 1$
- The Hall identity [ [x,y]^{2},z] = 0 for 2 by 2 matrices, showing that this is a polynomial identity ring
- The Hall–Petresco identity for groups expressing x^{m}y^{m} in terms of powers of elements of the descending central series.
