= Commutator collecting process =

In group theory, a branch of mathematics, the commutator collecting process is a method for writing an element of a group as a product of generators and their higher commutators arranged in a certain order. The commutator collecting process was introduced by Philip Hall in 1934 and articulated by Wilhelm Magnus in 1937. The process is sometimes called a "collection process".

The process can be generalized to define a totally ordered subset of a free non-associative algebra, that is, a free magma; this subset is called the Hall set. Members of the Hall set are binary trees; these can be placed in one-to-one correspondence with words, these being called the Hall words; the Lyndon words are a special case. Hall sets are used to construct a basis for a free Lie algebra, entirely analogously to the commutator collecting process. Hall words also provide a unique factorization of monoids.

== Statement ==
The commutator collecting process is usually stated for free groups, as a similar theorem then holds for any group by writing it as a quotient of a free group.

Suppose F_{1} is a free group on generators a_{1}, ..., a_{m}. Define the descending central series by putting

F_{n+1} = [F_{n}, F_{1}]

The basic commutators are elements of F_{1} defined and ordered as follows:

- The basic commutators of weight 1 are the generators a_{1}, ..., a_{m}.
- The basic commutators of weight w > 1 are the elements [x, y] where x and y are basic commutators whose weights sum to w, such that x > y and if x = [u, v] for basic commutators u and v then v ≤ y.

Commutators are ordered so that x > y if x has weight greater than that of y, and for commutators of any fixed weight some total ordering is chosen.

Then F_{n} / F_{n+1} is a finitely generated free abelian group with a basis consisting of basic commutators of weight n.

Then any element of F can be written as

$$g=c_1^{n_1}c_2^{n_2}\cdots c_k^{n_k}c$$

where the c_{i} are the basic commutators of weight at most m arranged in order, and c is a product of commutators of weight greater than m, and the n_{i} are integers.

== See also ==
- Hall–Petresco identity
- Monoid factorisation

== Reading ==
- Hall, Marshall (1959), The theory of groups, Macmillan, MR 0103215
- Huppert, B. (1967), Endliche Gruppen (in German), Berlin, New York: Springer-Verlag, pp. 90–93, ISBN 978-3-540-03825-2, MR 0224703, OCLC 527050
