= Free Lie algebra =

In mathematics, a free Lie algebra over a field K is a Lie algebra generated by a set X, without any imposed relations other than the defining relations of alternating K-bilinearity and the Jacobi identity.

== Definition ==
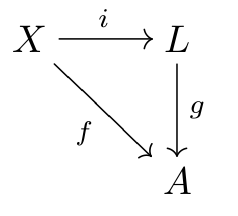

The definition of the free Lie algebra generated by a set X is as follows:

Let X be a set and $i\colon X \to L$ a morphism of sets (function) from X into a Lie algebra L. The Lie algebra L is called free on X if $i$ is the universal morphism; that is, if for any Lie algebra A with a morphism of sets $f\colon X \to A$, there is a unique Lie algebra morphism $g\colon L\to A$ such that $f = g \circ i$.

Given a set X, one can show that there exists a unique free Lie algebra $L(X)$ generated by X.

In the language of category theory, the functor sending a set X to the Lie algebra generated by X is the free functor from the category of sets to the category of Lie algebras. That is, it is left adjoint to the forgetful functor.

The free Lie algebra on a set X is naturally graded. The 1-graded component of the free Lie algebra is just the free vector space on that set.

One can alternatively define a free Lie algebra on a vector space V as left adjoint to the forgetful functor from Lie algebras over a field K to vector spaces over the field K – forgetting the Lie algebra structure, but remembering the vector space structure.

== Universal enveloping algebra ==
The universal enveloping algebra of a free Lie algebra on a set X is the free associative algebra generated by X. By the Poincaré–Birkhoff–Witt theorem it is the "same size" as the symmetric algebra of the free Lie algebra (meaning that if both sides are graded by giving elements of X degree 1 then they are isomorphic as graded vector spaces). This can be used to describe the dimension of the piece of the free Lie algebra of any given degree.

Ernst Witt showed that the number of basic commutators of degree k in the free Lie algebra on an m-element set is given by the necklace polynomial:

$$M_m(k) = \frac{1}{k}\sum_{d|k}\mu(d)\cdot m^{k/d},$$

where $\mu$ is the Möbius function.

The graded dual of the universal enveloping algebra of a free Lie algebra on a finite set is the shuffle algebra. This essentially follows because universal enveloping algebras have the structure of a Hopf algebra, and the shuffle product describes the action of comultiplication in this algebra. See tensor algebra for a detailed exposition of the inter-relation between the shuffle product and comultiplication.

== Hall sets ==
An explicit basis of the free Lie algebra can be given in terms of a Hall set, which is a particular kind of subset inside the free magma on X. Elements of the free magma are binary trees, with their leaves labelled by elements of X. Hall sets were introduced by Marshall Hall (1950) based on work of Philip Hall on groups. Subsequently, Wilhelm Magnus showed that they arise as the graded Lie algebra associated with the filtration on a free group given by the lower central series. This correspondence was motivated by commutator identities in group theory due to Philip Hall and Witt.

== Lyndon basis ==
The Lyndon words are a special case of the Hall words, and so in particular there is a basis of the free Lie algebra corresponding to Lyndon words. This is called the Lyndon basis, named after Roger Lyndon. (This is also called the Chen–Fox–Lyndon basis or the Lyndon–Shirshov basis, and is essentially the same as the Shirshov basis.) There is a bijection γ from the Lyndon words in an ordered alphabet to a basis of the free Lie algebra on this alphabet defined as follows:

- If a word w has length 1 then $\gamma(w) = w$ (considered as a generator of the free Lie algebra).
- If w has length at least 2, then write $w = uv$ for Lyndon words u, v with v as long as possible (the "standard factorization"). Then $\gamma(w) = [\gamma(u),\gamma(v)]$.

== Shirshov–Witt theorem ==
Anatoly Širšov (1953) and Witt (1956) showed that any Lie subalgebra of a free Lie algebra is itself a free Lie algebra.

== Applications ==
Serre's theorem on a semisimple Lie algebra uses a free Lie algebra to construct a semisimple algebra out of generators and relations.

The Milnor invariants of a link group are related to the free Lie algebra on the components of the link, as discussed in that article.

See also Lie operad for the use of a free Lie algebra in the construction of the operad.

== See also ==
- Free object
- Free algebra
- Free group
