= Cyclic language =

Set of strings closed w.r.t. cyclic shift, repetition, and root

In computer science, more particularly in formal language theory, a cyclic language is a set of strings that is closed with respect to repetition, root, and cyclic shift.

== Definition ==
If A is a set of symbols, and A^{*} is the set of all strings built from symbols in A, then a string set L ⊆ A^{*} is called a formal language over the alphabet A. The language L is called cyclic if

1. ∀w∈A^{*}. ∀n>0. w ∈ L ⇔ w^{n} ∈ L, and
2. ∀v,w∈A^{*}. vw ∈ L ⇔ wv ∈ L,

where w^{n} denotes the n-fold repetition of the string w, and vw denotes the concatenation of the strings v and w.

== Examples ==
For example, using the alphabet A = {a, b }, the language

L =	{		a^{p}b^{n_{1}}	a^{n_{2}}b^{n_{2}}	...	a^{n_{k}}b^{n_{k}}	a^{q}	:	n_{i} ≥ 0 and p+q = n_{1} }
∪	{	b^{p}	a^{n_{1}}b^{n_{1}}	a^{n_{2}}b^{n_{2}}	...	a^{n_{k}} b^{q}		:	n_{i} ≥ 0 and p+q = n_{k} }

is cyclic, but not regular. However, L is context-free, since M = { a^{n_{1}}b^{n_{1}} a^{n_{2}}b^{n_{2}} ... a^{n_{k}} b^{n_{k}} : n_{i} ≥ 0 } is, and context-free languages are closed under circular shift; L is obtained as circular shift of M.
