= Gustave Léon Niox =

French general and military historian

Général Gustave Léon Niox
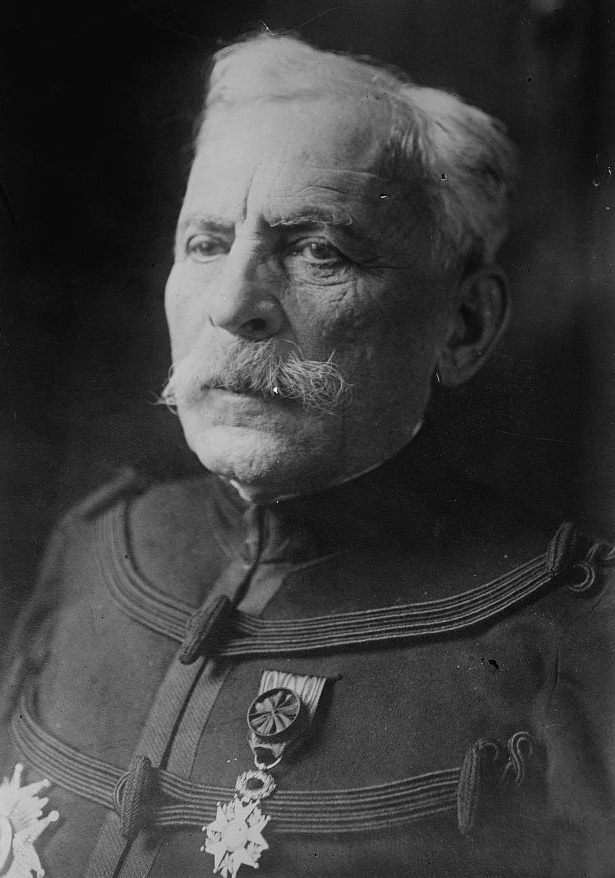
- Born: 8 February 1840; Provins, France
- Died: 26 October 1921 (aged 81); Paris, France
- Military career
- Allegiance: France
- Branch: French Army
- Rank: Général of the French Army
- Awards: Grand Officer of the Legion of Honour Médaille commémorative de l'expédition du Mexique; Ordre des Palmes Académiques Imperial Order of Our Lady of Guadeloupe
- Other work: Governor of Les Invalides (1902–1919)

Gustave Léon Niox (8 February 1840 – 26 October 1921) was a French general, Governor of Les Invalides, director of the Musée de l'Armée, and a military historian.

== Career ==
Born in 1840 to Eutrope Léon Niox and Elisabeth Caroline Desrayaud, he entered the Ecole Spéciale Militaire de Saint-Cyr in 1856 to join the 10th Infantry Regiment, then l'École d'État-Major in 1859, training to command the 66th Regiment in January 1861. He served with the Zouaves of the Imperial Guard and the second regiment of the Chasseurs d'Afrique, and was part of the French intervention in Mexico in the general staff, first in the topographical service, then later in the historical services.

He returned to France to serve in the Ministry of Defense. He served in the Franco-Prussian War as a member of the general staff for the 6th Army of the Rhine, and was taken prisoner during the siege of Metz. On his return in 1871 he was transferred to join the staff of l'Ecole d'État-Major, teaching cosmography, physical geography, and statistics. He was made inspector of telegraph services in 1898.

== Historian ==
He became professor at l'École Supérieure de Guerre in 1882.

Put on reserve in 1910, he began in earnest on his history. A number of his writings were published, and had a wide influence on the public and on the military on matters of military geography.

He died in Paris on October 26, 1921.

== Publications ==
- De l'emploi des chemins de fer pour les mouvements stratégiques, Paris, Dumaine, 1873.
- Expédition du Mexique : 1861-1867, Librairie militaire de J. Dumaine, 1874
- Notions de géologie [Texte imprimé] : géographie militaire, Paris, J. Dumaine, 1876.
- L'Empire russe, Corbeil, impr. de Crété, 1886.
- L'Indo-Chine, Corbeil, impr. de Crété, 1886.
- Péninsule des Balkans, Corbeil, impr. de Crété, 1886.
- Sénégal et NIger, Corbeil, impr. de Crété, 1886.
- Ct Niox, Eugène Darsy, Atlas de géographie physique, politique et historique à l'usage des classes, Paris, G. Delagrave.
- La Guerre de 1870. Simple récit, Paris, C. Delagrave, 1896.
- La Guerre Russo-Japonaise. Chroniques, Ch. Delgrave, 1906.
- L'Hôtel des Invalides, Paris, Ch. Delagrave, 1909.
- Drapeaux et trophées, résumé de l'histoire militaire contemporaine de la France, catalogue du Musée de l'armée, Paris, Ch. Delagrave, 1910.
- La Grande guerre, 1914-1918, simple récit, Paris, J. de Gigord, 1921.
- Sept volumes de la Géographie militaire publiés entre 1876 et 1895.

== Notes and references ==
http://www.ecole-superieure-de-guerre.fr/prof-niox.html
