= Commemorative medal of the Mexico Expedition =

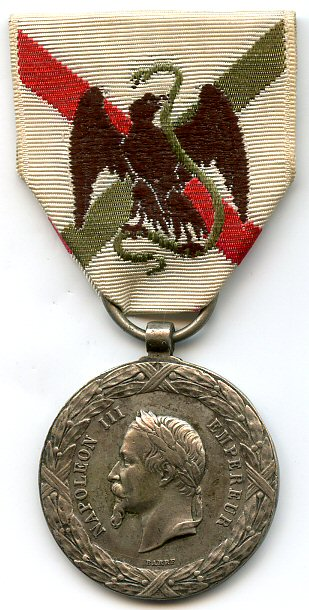
- Commemorative medal of the Mexico Expedition (obverse)
- Type: Commemorative campaign medal
- Awarded for: Military service in Mexico 1862-1863
- Presented by: France
- Eligibility: French citizens and foreign nationals serving in the ranks of the French Foreign Legion
- Status: No longer awarded
- Established: 29 August 1863

Highlights
- Total: ~38,000
- Ribbon of the Commemorative medal of the Mexico Expedition

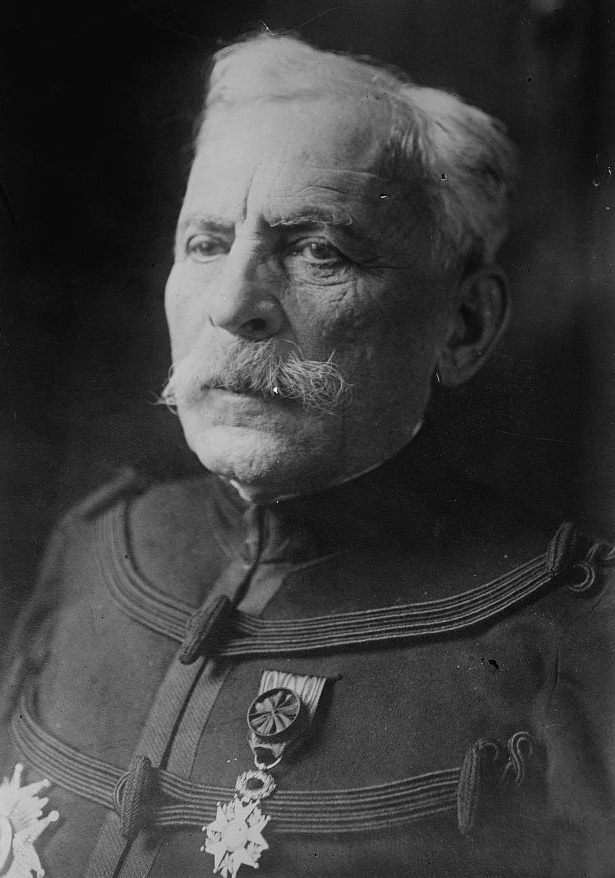
General Gustave Léon Niox, a recipient of the Commemorative medal of the Mexico Expedition

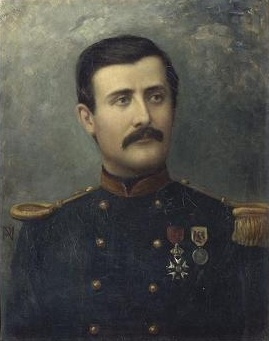
Major Napoléon Charles Bonaparte, 5th Prince of Canino, a recipient of the Commemorative medal of the Mexico Expedition

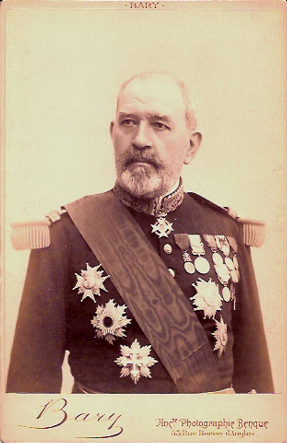
Admiral Henri Rieunier, a recipient of the Commemorative medal of the Mexico Expedition

The Commemorative medal of the Mexico Expedition (French: Médaille commémorative de l'expédition du Mexique) was a French commemorative campaign medal established by decree of French Emperor Napoleon III on 29 August 1863 to recognize military service during the 1862-1863 French intervention in Mexico.

The Mexican expedition was undertaken in 1862 on order of Emperor Napoleon III following a financial dispute with the Republic of Mexico and his personal desire to create a Catholic empire on the continent to counterbalance U.S. influence. On 7 January 1862, approximately 3,000 French soldiers landed at Vera Cruz. Small British and Spanish contingents that were originally part of the adventure preferred to withdraw quickly leaving only the French forces assisted by small numbers of Austrian, Belgian and Turkish troops.

These forces, whose numbers would later rise to approximately 38,000 men, were successively placed under the command of generals Charles de Lorencez, Élie Frédéric Forey and finally François Achille Bazaine. The campaign was the scene of some of the most notable battles in French military history, such as the glorious struggle for the village of Camaron where, on 30 April 1863, sixty two legionnaires resisted bravely for nine hours against over two thousand Mexicans, allowing for the capture of the city of Puebla on 17 May 1863 thus paving the way to Mexico. In the capital, an assembly of notables recognized Archduke Maximilian of Habsburg, brother of Emperor Franz Joseph of Austria, as Emperor of Mexico.

However, even with the support of 20,000 Mexicans who embraced the new emperor, Maximilian's forces were harassed in their work of pacification by the troops of President Benito Juárez who had the support of the United States. In February 1867, Emperor Napoleon III ordered the repatriation of all remaining French troops from Mexico, the last elements left the port of Vera Cruz on 12 March 1867. An abandoned Emperor Maximilian, defeated and captured near the city of Querétaro, was executed in June of that year.

== Award statute ==
The Commemorative medal of the Mexico Expedition was awarded by the Emperor, to all those who took part in the Mexico Expedition, upon nomination and approval by the minister under which the corps or service of the potential recipient was attached. The medal was to be worn on the left breast.

No minimum time of service was mentioned in the award statute.

A later decree of 16 April 1864 added the Commemorative medal of the Mexico Expedition to the list of previous awards that could be revoked following a condemnation to a fixed prison term of one year or more for a crime committed by the recipient.

== Award description ==
The Commemorative medal of the Mexico Expedition was a 30 mm in diameter circular silver medal. Its obverse bore the left profile of Emperor Napoleon III crowned with a laurel wreath surrounded by the relief inscription "NAPOLEON III" "EMPEREUR" (English: "NAPOLEON III EMPEROR"). A 4 mm wide relief laurel wreath ran along the entire circumference of both the obverse and reverse of the medal.

On the reverse, within the laurel wreath, the circular relief inscription " * EXPEDITION DU MEXIQUE * 1862•1863" (English: "MEXICAN EXPEDITION 1862•1863"), two small five pointed stars separating the text from the dates. At the center, the relief inscription on five lines of the campaign's major battles "CUMBRES" "CERRO-BORREGO" "SAN-LORENZO" "PUEBLA" "MEXICO".

The medal hung from a 36 mm wide white silk moiré ribbon bearing 5 mm red and green stripes arranged at a 45 degree angle forming a cross, over which was superimposed a black eagle, its wings spread and holding a green snake in its beak and talons, a design inspired by the coat of arms of Mexico.

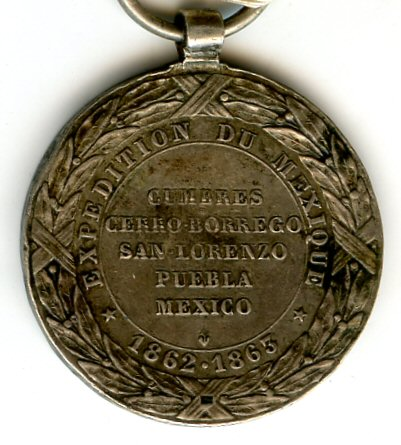
Reverse of the Commemorative medal of the Mexico Expedition

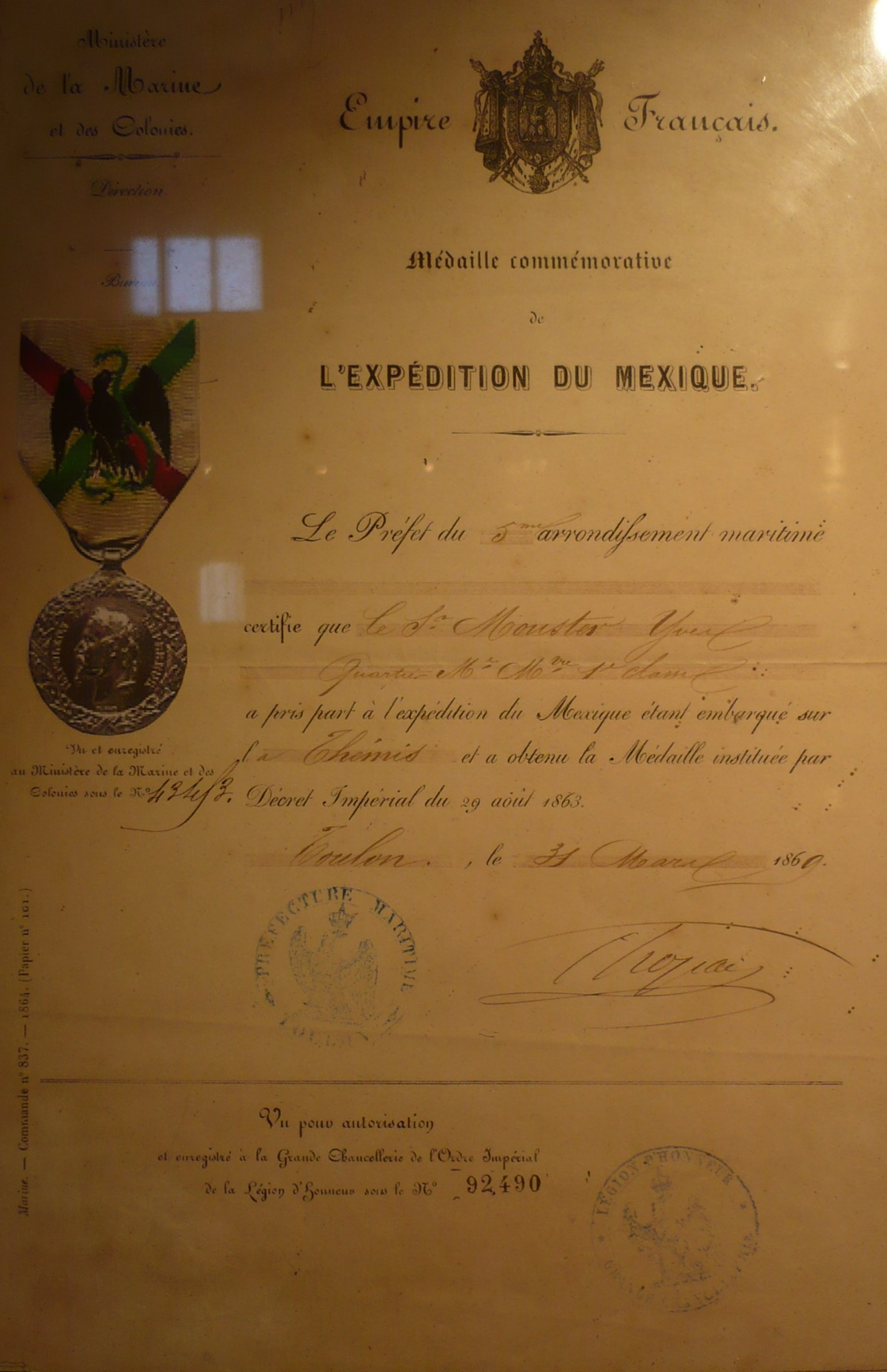
Award certificate.

Coat of arms of Mexico

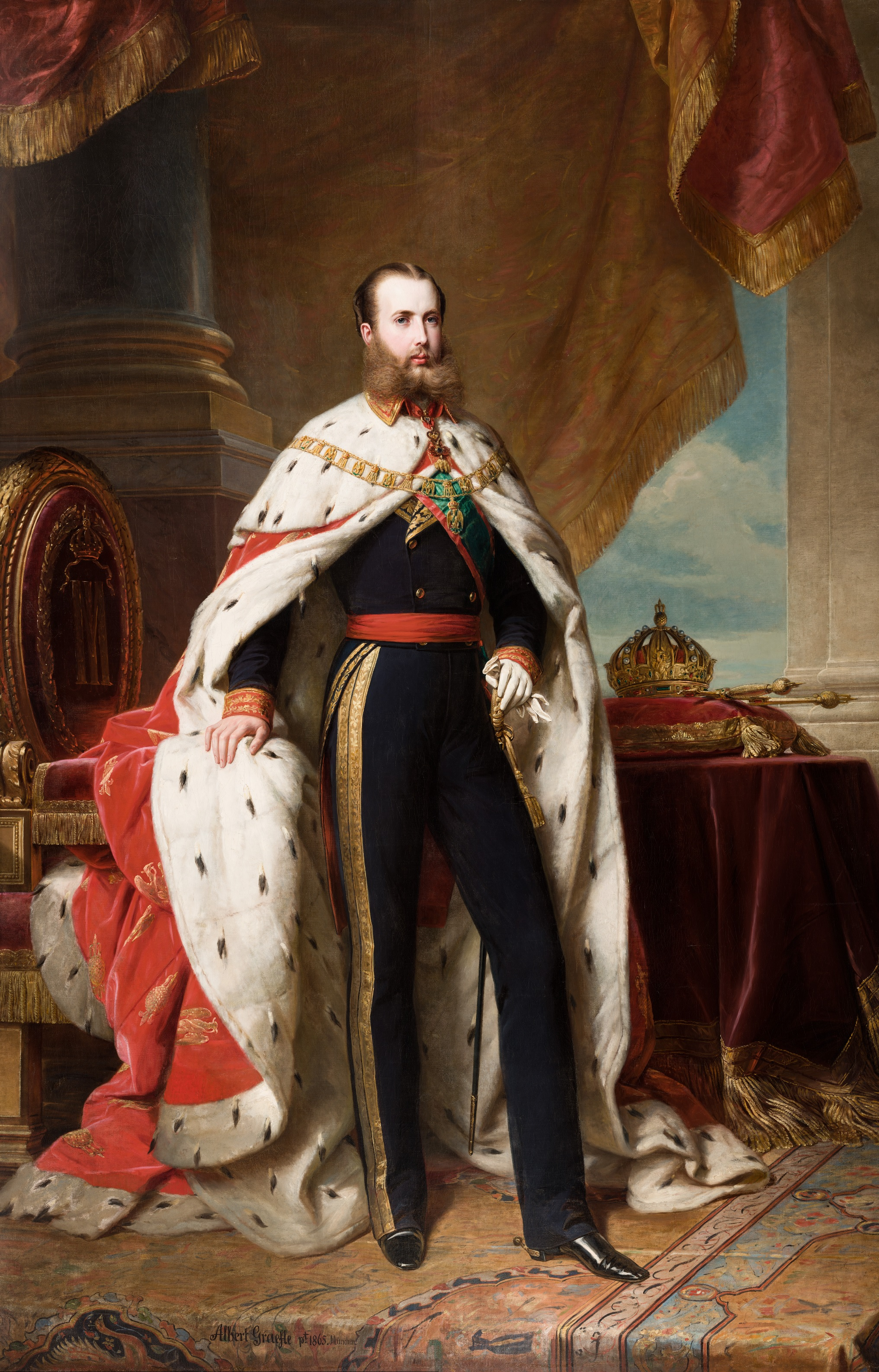
Emperor Maximilian I of Mexico

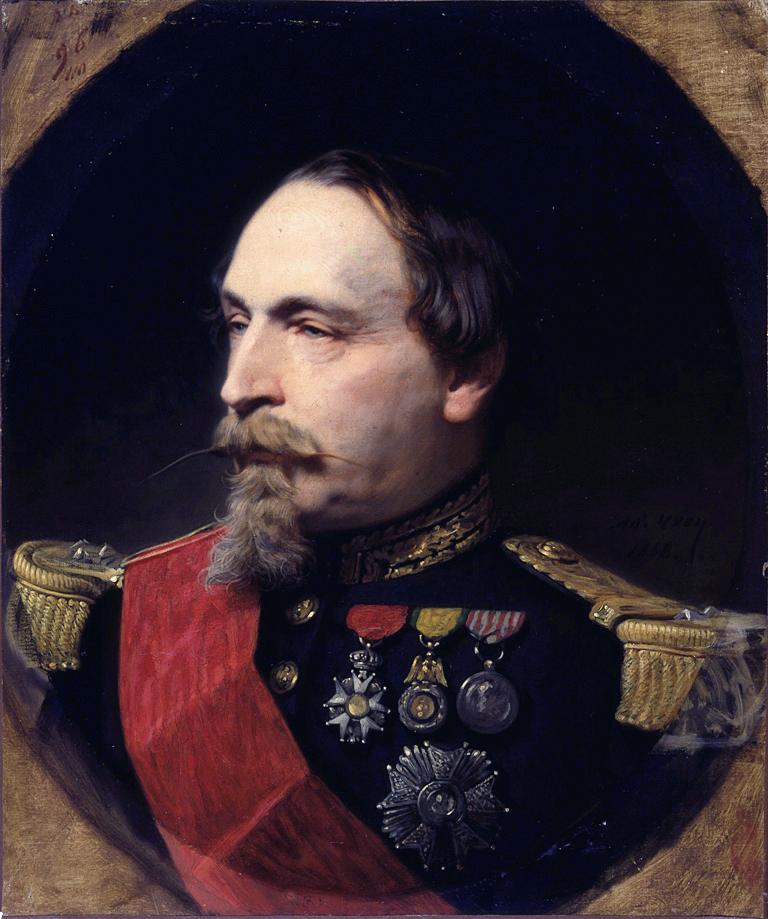
Emperor Napoléon III

== Notable recipients (partial list) ==
- Marshal of France Élie Frédéric Forey
- General Pierre Émile Arnaud Édouard de Colbert-Chabannais
- General Gustave Léon Niox
- General Jean François Jules Herbé
- General Armand Alexandre de Castagny
- General Philippe Marie André Roussel de Courcy
- General Auguste Mercier
- General Édouard Aymard
- Admiral Henri Rieunier
- Vice Admiral Édouard Pottier
- Rear admiral Benjamin Jaurès
- Colonel Charles Nicolas Friant
- Colonel Charles Paul Narcisse Moreau
- Navy captain Henri Rivière
- Major Napoléon Charles Bonaparte, 5th Prince of Canino
- Ottoman general Vitalis Pacha

== See also ==
- 1st Foreign Regiment
- Battle of Camarón
- List of battles of the French intervention in Mexico
- History of Mexico
- Pastry War
- Reform War
