= Shuffle algebra =

Mathematical concept

In mathematics, a shuffle algebra is a Hopf algebra with a basis corresponding to words on some set, whose product is given by the shuffle product X ⧢ Y of two words X, Y: the sum of all ways of interlacing them. The interlacing is given by the riffle shuffle permutation.

The shuffle algebra on a finite set is the graded dual of the universal enveloping algebra of the free Lie algebra on the set.

Over the rational numbers, the shuffle algebra is isomorphic to the polynomial algebra in the Lyndon words.

The shuffle product occurs in generic settings in non-commutative algebras; this is because it is able to preserve the relative order of factors being multiplied together - the riffle shuffle permutation. This can be held in contrast to the divided power structure, which becomes appropriate when factors are commutative.

== Shuffle product ==
The shuffle product of words of lengths m and n is a sum over the ((m+n)!)/m!n! ways of interleaving the two words, as shown in the following examples:

ab ⧢ xy = abxy + axby + xaby + axyb + xayb + xyab
aaa ⧢ aa = 10aaaaa

It may be defined inductively by

u ⧢ ε = ε ⧢ u = u
ua ⧢ vb = (u ⧢ vb)a + (ua ⧢ v)b

where ε is the empty word, a and b are single elements, and u and v are arbitrary words.

The shuffle product was introduced by Eilenberg & Mac Lane (1953). The name "shuffle product" refers to the fact that the product can be thought of as a sum over all ways of riffle shuffling two words together: this is the riffle shuffle permutation. The product is commutative and associative.

The shuffle product of two words in some alphabet is often denoted by the shuffle product symbol ⧢ (Unicode character U+29E2 shuffle product, derived from the Cyrillic letter ⟨ш⟩ sha).

== Infiltration product ==
The closely related infiltration product was introduced by Chen, Fox & Lyndon (1958). It is defined inductively on words over an alphabet A by

fa ↑ ga = (f ↑ ga)a + (fa ↑ g)a + (f ↑ g)a
fa ↑ gb = (f ↑ gb)a + (fa ↑ g)b

For example:

ab ↑ ab = ab + 2aab + 2abb + 4 aabb + 2abab
ab ↑ ba = aba + bab + abab + 2abba + 2baab + baba

The infiltration product is also commutative and associative.

== See also ==
- Hopf algebra of permutations
- Zinbiel algebra
