= Filtered algebra =

In mathematics, a filtered algebra is a generalization of the notion of a graded algebra. Examples appear in many branches of mathematics, especially in homological algebra and representation theory.

A filtered algebra over the field $k$ is an algebra $(A,\cdot)$ over $k$ that has an increasing sequence $\{0\} \subseteq F_0 \subseteq F_1 \subseteq \cdots \subseteq F_i \subseteq \cdots \subseteq A$ of subspaces of $A$ such that

$$A=\bigcup_{i\in \mathbb{N}} F_{i}$$

and that is compatible with the multiplication in the following sense:

$$\forall m,n \in \mathbb{N},\quad F_m\cdot F_n\subseteq F_{n+m}.$$

== Associated graded algebra ==
In general, there is the following construction that produces a graded algebra out of a filtered algebra.

If $A$ is a filtered algebra, then the associated graded algebra $\mathcal{G}(A)$ is defined as follows:

- As a vector space
  $$\mathcal{G}(A)=\bigoplus_{n\in \mathbb{N}}G_n\,,$$
  where,
  $G_0=F_0,$ and
  $$\forall n>0,\ G_n = F_n/F_{n-1}\,,$$
- the multiplication is defined by
  $$(x+F_{n-1})(y+F_{m-1}) = x\cdot y+F_{n+m-1}$$
  for all $x \in F_n$ and $y \in F_m$. (More precisely, the multiplication map $\mathcal{G}(A)\times \mathcal{G}(A) \to \mathcal{G}(A)$ is combined from the maps
  $$(F_n / F_{n-1}) \times (F_m / F_{m-1}) \to F_{n+m}/F_{n+m-1}, \ \ \ \ \ \left(x+F_{n-1},y+F_{m-1}\right) \mapsto x\cdot y+F_{n+m-1}$$
  for all $n\geq 0$ and $m\geq 0$.)

The multiplication is well-defined and endows $\mathcal{G}(A)$ with the structure of a graded algebra, with gradation $\{G_n\}_{n \in \mathbb{N}}.$ Furthermore if $A$ is associative then so is $\mathcal{G}(A)$. Also, if $A$ is unital, such that the unit lies in $F_0$, then $\mathcal{G}(A)$ will be unital as well.

As algebras $A$ and $\mathcal{G}(A)$ are distinct (with the exception of the trivial case that $A$ is graded) but as vector spaces they are isomorphic. (One can prove by induction that $\bigoplus_{i=0}^nG_i$ is isomorphic to $F_n$ as vector spaces).

== Examples ==
Any graded algebra graded by $\mathbb{N}$, for example $A = \bigoplus_{n\in \mathbb{N}} A_n$, has a filtration given by $F_n = \bigoplus_{i=0}^n A_i$.

An example of a filtered algebra is the Clifford algebra $\operatorname{Cliff}(V,q)$ of a vector space $V$ endowed with a quadratic form $q.$ The associated graded algebra is $\bigwedge V$, the exterior algebra of $V.$

The symmetric algebra on the dual of an affine space is a filtered algebra of polynomials; on a vector space, one instead obtains a graded algebra.

The universal enveloping algebra of a Lie algebra $\mathfrak{g}$ is also naturally filtered. The PBW theorem states that the associated graded algebra is simply $\mathrm{Sym} (\mathfrak{g})$.

Scalar differential operators on a manifold $M$ form a filtered algebra where the filtration is given by the degree of differential operators. The associated graded algebra is the commutative algebra of smooth functions on the cotangent bundle $T^*M$ which are polynomial along the fibers of the projection $\pi\colon T^*M\rightarrow M$.

The group algebra of a group with a length function is a filtered algebra.

== See also ==
- Filtration (mathematics)
- Length function
