= Monoid factorisation =

In mathematics, a factorisation of a free monoid is a sequence of subsets of words with the property that every word in the free monoid can be written as a concatenation of elements drawn from the subsets. The Chen–Fox–Lyndon theorem states that the Lyndon words furnish a factorisation. The Schützenberger theorem relates the definition in terms of a multiplicative property to an additive property.

Let A^{∗} be the free monoid on an alphabet A. Let X_{i} be a sequence of subsets of A^{∗} indexed by a totally ordered index set I. A factorisation of a word w in A^{∗} is an expression

$$w = x_{i_1} x_{i_2} \cdots x_{i_n} \$$

with $x_{i_j} \in X_{i_j}$ and $i_1 \ge i_2 \ge \ldots \ge i_n$. Some authors reverse the order of the inequalities.

== Chen–Fox–Lyndon theorem ==
A Lyndon word over a totally ordered alphabet A is a word that is lexicographically less than all its rotations. The Chen–Fox–Lyndon theorem states that every string may be formed in a unique way by concatenating a lexicographically non-increasing sequence of Lyndon words. Hence taking X_{l} to be the singleton set {l} for each Lyndon word l, with the index set L of Lyndon words ordered lexicographically, we obtain a factorisation of A^{∗}. Such a factorisation can be found in linear time and constant space by Duval's algorithm. The algorithm in Python code is:

def chen_fox_lyndon_factorization(s: list[int]) -> list[int]:
    """Monoid factorisation using the Chen–Fox–Lyndon theorem.

    Args:
        s: a list of integers

    Returns:
        a list of integers
    """
    n = len(s)
    factorization = []
    i = 0
    while i < n:
        j, k = i + 1, i
        while j < n and s[k] <= s[j]:
            if s[k] < s[j]:
                k = i
            else:
                k += 1
            j += 1
        while i <= k:
            factorization.append(s[i:i + j - k])
            i += j - k
    return factorization

== Hall words ==
The Hall set provides a factorization. Indeed, Lyndon words are a special case of Hall words. The article on Hall words provides a sketch of all of the mechanisms needed to establish a proof of this factorization.

== Bisection ==
A bisection of a free monoid is a factorisation with just two classes X_{0}, X_{1}.

Examples:

A = {a,b}, X_{0} = {A^{∗}b}, X_{1} = {a}.

If X, Y are disjoint sets of non-empty words, then (X,Y) is a bisection of A^{∗} if and only if

$$YX \cup A = X \cup Y \ .$$

As a consequence, for any partition P, Q of A^{+} there is a unique bisection (X,Y) with X a subset of P and Y a subset of Q.

== Schützenberger theorem ==
This theorem states that a sequence X_{i} of subsets of A^{∗} forms a factorisation if and only if two of the following three statements hold:

- Every element of A^{∗} has at least one expression in the required form;
- Every element of A^{∗} has at most one expression in the required form;
- Each conjugate class C meets just one of the monoids M_{i} = X_{i}^{∗} and the elements of C in M_{i} are conjugate in M_{i}.

== See also ==
- Sesquipower
