= Serre's theorem on a semisimple Lie algebra =

In abstract algebra, specifically the theory of Lie algebras, Serre's theorem states: given a (finite reduced) root system $\Phi$, there exists a finite-dimensional semisimple Lie algebra whose root system is the given $\Phi$. It is named after Jean-Pierre Serre.

== Statement ==
Given a root system $\Phi$ in a Euclidean space with an inner product $(\cdot,\cdot)$, and the usual bilinear form $\langle \beta, \alpha \rangle = 2(\alpha, \beta)/(\alpha, \alpha)$, with a fixed base $\{ \alpha_1, \dots, \alpha_n \}$, there exists a Lie algebra $\mathfrak g$ generated by the $3n$ elements $e_i, f_i, h_i$ (for $1\leq i\leq n$) and relations:

$$[h_i, h_j] = 0,$$
$$[e_i, f_j] = \delta_{ij}h_i,$$
$$[h_i, e_j] = \langle \alpha_i, \alpha_j \rangle e_j, \, [h_i, f_j] = -\langle \alpha_i, \alpha_j \rangle f_j,$$
$$\operatorname{ad}(e_i)^{-\langle \alpha_i, \alpha_j \rangle+1}(e_j) = 0, i \ne j,$$
$$\operatorname{ad}(f_i)^{-\langle \alpha_i, \alpha_j \rangle+1}(f_j) = 0, i \ne j.$$

We also have that $\mathfrak g$ is a finite-dimensional semisimple Lie algebra with the Cartan subalgebra $\mathfrak h = \bigoplus_{i}h_i$ and that the root system of $\mathfrak g$ is $\Phi$.

The square matrix $[\langle \alpha_i, \alpha_j \rangle]_{1 \le i, j \le n}$ is called the Cartan matrix. Thus, with this notion, the theorem states that, given a Cartan matrix A, there exists a unique (up to an isomorphism) finite-dimensional semisimple Lie algebra $\mathfrak g(A)$ associated to $A$. The construction of a semisimple Lie algebra from a Cartan matrix can be generalized by weakening the definition of a Cartan matrix. The (generally infinite-dimensional) Lie algebra associated to a generalized Cartan matrix is called a Kac–Moody algebra.

== Sketch of proof ==
The proof here is taken from (Serre 1966, Ch. VI, Appendix.) and (Kac 1990, Theorem 1.2.). Let $a_{ij} = \langle \alpha_i, \alpha_j \rangle$ and then let $\widetilde{\mathfrak g}$ be the Lie algebra generated by (1) the generators $e_i, f_i, h_i$ and (2) the relations:

- $[h_i, h_j] = 0,$
- $[e_i, f_i] = h_i$, $[e_i, f_j] = 0, i \ne j,$
- $[h_i, e_j] = a_{ij} e_j, [h_i, f_j] = -a_{ij} f_j.$

Let $\mathfrak{h}$ be the free vector space spanned by $h_i$, V the free vector space with a basis $v_1, \dots, v_n$ and $T = \bigoplus_{l=0}^{\infty} V^{\otimes l}$ the tensor algebra over it. Consider the following representation of a Lie algebra:

$$\pi : \widetilde{\mathfrak g} \to \mathfrak{gl}(T)$$

given by: for $a \in T, h \in \mathfrak{h}, \lambda \in \mathfrak{h}^*$,

- $\pi(f_i)a = v_i \otimes a,$
- $\pi(h)1 = \langle \lambda, \, h \rangle 1, \pi(h)(v_j \otimes a) = -\langle \alpha_j, h \rangle v_j \otimes a + v_j \otimes \pi(h)a,$ inductively,
- $\pi(e_i)1 = 0, \, \pi(e_i)(v_j \otimes a) = \delta_{ij} h_i(a) + v_j \otimes \pi(e_i)a,$ inductively.

It is not trivial that this is indeed a well-defined representation and that has to be checked by hand. From this representation, one deduces the following properties: let $\widetilde{\mathfrak{n}}_+$ (resp. $\widetilde{\mathfrak{n}}_-$) the subalgebras of $\widetilde{\mathfrak g}$ generated by the $e_i$'s (resp. the $f_i$'s).

- $\widetilde{\mathfrak{n}}_+$ (resp. $\widetilde{\mathfrak{n}}_-$) is a free Lie algebra generated by the $e_i$'s (resp. the $f_i$'s).
- As a vector space, $\widetilde{\mathfrak g} = \widetilde{\mathfrak{n}}_+ \bigoplus \mathfrak{h} \bigoplus \widetilde{\mathfrak{n}}_-$.
- $\widetilde{\mathfrak{n}}_+ = \bigoplus_{0 \ne \alpha \in Q_+} \widetilde{\mathfrak g}_{\alpha}$ where $\widetilde{\mathfrak g}_{\alpha} = \{ x \in \widetilde{\mathfrak g}|[h, x] = \alpha(h) x, h \in \mathfrak h \}$ and, similarly, $\widetilde{\mathfrak{n}}_- = \bigoplus_{0 \ne \alpha \in Q_+} \widetilde{\mathfrak g}_{-\alpha}$.
- (root space decomposition) $\widetilde{\mathfrak g} = \left( \bigoplus_{0 \ne \alpha \in Q_+} \widetilde{\mathfrak g}_{-\alpha} \right) \bigoplus \mathfrak h \bigoplus \left( \bigoplus_{0 \ne \alpha \in Q_+} \widetilde{\mathfrak g}_{\alpha} \right)$.

For each ideal $\mathfrak i$ of $\widetilde{\mathfrak g}$, one can easily show that $\mathfrak i$ is homogeneous with respect to the grading given by the root space decomposition; i.e., $\mathfrak i = \bigoplus_{\alpha} (\widetilde{\mathfrak g}_{\alpha} \cap \mathfrak i)$. It follows that the sum of ideals intersecting $\mathfrak h$ trivially, it itself intersects $\mathfrak h$ trivially. Let $\mathfrak r$ be the sum of all ideals intersecting $\mathfrak h$ trivially. Then there is a vector space decomposition: $\mathfrak r = (\mathfrak r \cap \widetilde{\mathfrak n}_-) \oplus (\mathfrak r \cap \widetilde{\mathfrak n}_+)$. In fact, it is a $\widetilde{\mathfrak g}$-module decomposition. Let

$$\mathfrak g = \widetilde{\mathfrak g}/\mathfrak r.$$

Then it contains a copy of $\mathfrak h$, which is identified with $\mathfrak h$ and

$$\mathfrak g = \mathfrak{n}_+ \bigoplus \mathfrak{h} \bigoplus \mathfrak{n}_-$$

where $\mathfrak{n}_+$ (resp. $\mathfrak{n}_-$) are the subalgebras generated by the images of $e_i$'s (resp. the images of $f_i$'s).

One then shows: (1) the derived algebra $[\mathfrak g, \mathfrak g]$ here is the same as $\mathfrak g$ in the lead, (2) it is finite-dimensional and semisimple and (3) $[\mathfrak g, \mathfrak g] = \mathfrak g$.
