= Hall–Petresco identity =

Identity in group theory

In mathematics, the Hall–Petresco identity (sometimes misspelled Hall–Petrescu identity) is an identity holding in any group. It was introduced by Hall (1934) and Petresco (1954). It can be proved using the commutator collecting process, and implies that p-groups of small class are regular.

== Statement ==
The Hall–Petresco identity states that if x and y are elements of a group G and m is a positive integer then

$$x^my^m=(xy)^mc_2^{\binom{m}{2}}c_3^{\binom{m}{3}}\cdots c_{m-1}^{\binom{m}{m-1}}c_m$$

where each c_{i} is in the subgroup K_{i} of the descending central series of G.

== See also ==
- Baker–Campbell–Hausdorff formula
- Algebra of symbols
