= Charles Paul Narcisse Moreau =

French mathematician and chess player (1837–1916)

Colonel Charles Paul Narcisse Moreau (14 September 1837, in Paris – 6 July 1916) was a French soldier and mathematician. He served in the artillery and as an officier of the French Legion of Honor. He introduced Moreau's necklace-counting function into mathematics, and achieved the worst result ever recorded in an international chess tournament.

== Military service ==
Colonel Moreau's military career is given by documents on the Legion of Honor website as follows. He was promoted to lieutenant on 1 October 1861. He served in Mexico from 23 May 1863 to 22 March 1867 during the French intervention in Mexico and was named Chevalier de l'Ordre Impérial de la Guadeloupe on 16 September 1866 and was awarded the Commemorative medal of the Mexico Expedition. On 10 August 1868 he was promoted to captain. He served in Africa from 27 January 1869 to 3 August 1870, when he returned to take part in the Franco-Prussian War. He participated in the battle of Sedan on 1 September 1870, after which he was taken prisoner until 4 June 1871. He served again in Africa (Algeria) from 5 August 1871 until 20 November 1873, during which time he was made a chevalier of the French Legion of Honor on 20 November 1872. On 8 July 1886 he was promoted to lieutenant colonel, and on 15 April 1890 was promoted to colonel. He was made an officier of the French Legion of Honor on 5 July 1893.

== Mathematics and chess ==
Spinrad (2008a, 2008b) identified Moreau as the chess player "Colonel Moreau" who set a record for the worst-ever performance in an international tournament by losing all his 26 games in the 1903 Monte Carlo chess tournament. It is unclear why someone that weak was playing in an international tournament. He is sometimes said to have been a last-minute substitute for Mikhail Chigorin, who was apparently dropped after a dispute with the organizer Prince André Dadian, but Spinrad pointed out that this is unlikely because Moreau and Chigorin were both listed among the 14 competitors in a newspaper story in The New York Sun and Salt Lake Herald from 21 December 1902, several weeks before the tournament started on 10 February 1903. Moreau was on the tournament organizing committee for the 1902 Monte Carlo tournament.

Spinrad also pointed out that Moreau published several mathematical papers. In particular Moreau (1872) introduced Moreau's necklace-counting function, and Lucas (1891b, pp. 501–503) described a variation of this that he credited to Moreau. Moreau (1873) pointed out a counterexample to a lemma used by Adrien-Marie Legendre in his attempt to prove Dirichlet's theorem on arithmetic progressions. Lucas (1891, pp. 181–195) describes Moreau's analysis of the mathematical game "red and black" invented by Arnous de Rivière. Laisant (1891, p. 106) mentions Moreau's unpublished solution to a combinatorial problem involving rooks on a chessboard.

== Publications ==
- Moreau, C. (1872), "Sur les permutations circulaires distinctes (On distinct circular permutations)", Nouvelles annales de mathématiques, journal des candidats aux écoles polytechnique et normale, Sér. 2 (in French), 11: 309–314, JFM 04.0086.01
- Moreau, C. (1873), "Correspondence", Nouvelles annales de mathématiques, journal des candidats aux écoles polytechnique et normale, Sér. 2 (in French), 12: 322–324
- Moreau, C. (1875), "Propositions sur les nombres", Nouvelles annales de mathématiques, journal des candidats aux écoles polytechnique et normale, Sér. 2 (in French), 14: 274–275
- Moreau, C. (1875), "Questions", Nouvelles annales de mathématiques, journal des candidats aux écoles polytechnique et normale, Sér. 2 (in French), 14: 527–528
- Moreau, C. (1898), "Sur quelques théorèmes d'arithmétique", Nouvelles annales de mathématiques, journal des candidats aux écoles polytechnique et normale, Sér. 3 (in French), 17: 293–307, JFM 29.0146.02
- Moreau, C. (1902), "Solution d'un problème de probabilités", Archiv der Mathematik und Physik, Third Series, 4: 184–189

Moreau also published several notes titled "Solution de la question ...." in volumes XI to XVI of the journal Nouvelles annales de mathématiques giving solutions to questions asked in it.
