= Universal enveloping algebra =

Concept in mathematics

In mathematics, the universal enveloping algebra of a Lie algebra is the unital associative algebra whose representations correspond precisely to the representations of that Lie algebra.

Universal enveloping algebras are used in the representation theory of Lie groups and Lie algebras. For example, Verma modules can be constructed as quotients of the universal enveloping algebra. In addition, the enveloping algebra gives a precise definition for the Casimir operators. Because Casimir operators commute with all elements of a Lie algebra, they can be used to classify representations. The precise definition also allows the importation of Casimir operators into other areas of mathematics, specifically, those that have a differential algebra. They also play a central role in some recent developments in mathematics. In particular, their dual provides a commutative example of the objects studied in non-commutative geometry, the quantum groups. This dual can be shown, by the Gelfand–Naimark theorem, to contain the C* algebra of the corresponding Lie group. This relationship generalizes to the idea of Tannaka–Krein duality between compact topological groups and their representations.

From an analytic viewpoint, the universal enveloping algebra of the Lie algebra of a Lie group may be identified with the algebra of left-invariant differential operators on the group.

== Informal construction ==
The idea of the universal enveloping algebra is to embed a Lie algebra $\mathfrak{g}$ into an associative algebra $\mathcal{A}$ with identity in such a way that the abstract bracket operation in $\mathfrak{g}$ corresponds to the commutator $xy-yx$ in $\mathcal{A}$ and the algebra $\mathcal{A}$ is generated by the elements of $\mathfrak{g}$. There may be many ways to make such an embedding, but there is a unique "largest" such $\mathcal{A}$, called the universal enveloping algebra of $\mathfrak{g}$.

=== Function composition is associative ===
The associativity of the universal enveloping algebra can be understood as arising from the associativity of function composition. Consider the case where $\mathfrak{g}$ is just "some non-associative algebra" (without assuming it to be a Lie algebra). For any element $a\in\mathfrak{g}$, left-multiplication by $a$ defines a map, that is, a function $L_a:\mathfrak{g}\to\mathfrak{g}.$ The collection of all such maps, using function composition as a product, forms an associative algebra. Specifically, one has for any $a,b,c\in\mathfrak{g}$ that

$$\left(L_a \circ L_b\right) \circ L_c = L_a \circ \left(L_b \circ L_c\right) = L_a \circ L_b \circ L_c$$

An enveloping algebra is an algebra of all such functions $L_a$ with function composition as the product. It is manifestly associative, because function composition is associative.

This algebra is indeed an algebra over a field, because the various $L_a$ can be added to each other, and also multiplied by the scalars of $\mathfrak{g}$ (usually the reals or the complex numbers). Therefore, a primary task is to find a vector space basis for this enveloping algebra, and then define function composition in terms of this basis. That is, given $a,b\in\mathfrak{g}$ one wishes to find $p\in\mathfrak{g}$ such that $L_a \circ L_b = L_p$, and more generally, to find the smallest such set of $p\in\mathfrak{g}$ that span the space. By linearity, it is enough to work with the basis elements of $\mathfrak{g}.$

=== Generators and relations ===
Let $\mathfrak{g}$ be a Lie algebra, assumed finite-dimensional for simplicity, with basis $X_1,\ldots X_n$. Let $c_{ijk}$ be the structure constants for this basis, so that

$$[X_i,X_j]=\sum_{k=1}^n c_{ijk}X_k.$$

Then the universal enveloping algebra is the associative algebra (with identity) generated by elements $x_1,\ldots, x_n$ subject to the relations

$$x_i x_j -                          x_j x_i=\sum_{k=1}^n c_{ijk}x_k$$

and no other relations. Below we will make this "generators and relations" construction more precise by constructing the universal enveloping algebra as a quotient of the tensor algebra over $\mathfrak g$.

Consider, for example, the Lie algebra sl(2,C), spanned by the matrices

$$E = \begin{pmatrix}
0 & 1\\
0 & 0
\end{pmatrix}
\qquad
F = \begin{pmatrix}
0 & 0\\
1 & 0
\end{pmatrix}
\qquad
H = \begin{pmatrix}
1 & 0\\
0 & -1
\end{pmatrix}  ~,$$

which satisfy the commutation relations $[H,E]=2E$, $[H,F]=-2F$, and $[E,F]=H$. The universal enveloping algebra of sl(2,C) is then the algebra generated by three elements $e,f,h$ subject to the relations

$$he-eh=2e,\quad hf-fh=-2f,\quad ef-fe=h,$$

and no other relations. We emphasize that the universal enveloping algebra is not the same as (or contained in) the algebra of $2\times 2$ matrices. For example, the $2\times 2$ matrix $E$ satisfies $E^2=0$, as is easily verified. But in the universal enveloping algebra, the element $e$ does not satisfy $e^2=0$ because we do not impose this relation in the construction of the enveloping algebra. Indeed, it follows from the Poincaré–Birkhoff–Witt theorem (discussed § below) that the elements $1,e,e^2,e^3,\ldots$ are all linearly independent in the universal enveloping algebra.

=== Finding a basis ===
In general, elements of the universal enveloping algebra are linear combinations of products of the generators in all possible orders. Using the defining relations of the universal enveloping algebra, we can always re-order those products in a particular order, say with all the factors of $x_1$ first, then factors of $x_2$, etc. For example, whenever we have a term that contains $x_2 x_1$ (in the "wrong" order), we can use the relations to rewrite this as $x_1 x_2$ plus a linear combination of the $x_j$'s. Doing this sort of thing repeatedly eventually converts any element into a linear combination of terms in ascending order. Thus, elements of the form

$$x_1^{k_1}x_2^{k_2}\cdots x_n^{k_n}$$

with the $k_j$'s being non-negative integers, span the enveloping algebra. (We allow $k_j=0$, meaning that we allow terms in which no factors of $x_j$ occur.) The Poincaré–Birkhoff–Witt theorem, discussed below, asserts that these elements are linearly independent and thus form a basis for the universal enveloping algebra. In particular, the universal enveloping algebra is always infinite dimensional.

The Poincaré–Birkhoff–Witt theorem implies, in particular, that the elements $x_1,\ldots, x_n$ themselves are linearly independent. It is therefore common—if potentially confusing—to identify the $x_j$'s with the generators $X_j$ of the original Lie algebra. That is to say, we identify the original Lie algebra as the subspace of its universal enveloping algebra spanned by the generators. Although $\mathfrak{g}$ may be an algebra of $n\times n$ matrices, the universal enveloping of $\mathfrak{g}$ does not consist of (finite-dimensional) matrices. In particular, there is no finite-dimensional algebra that contains the universal enveloping of $\mathfrak{g}$; the universal enveloping algebra is always infinite dimensional. Thus, in the case of sl(2,C), if we identify our Lie algebra as a subspace of its universal enveloping algebra, we must not interpret $E$, $F$ and $H$ as $2\times 2$ matrices, but rather as symbols with no further properties (other than the commutation relations).

=== Formalities ===
The formal construction of the universal enveloping algebra takes the above ideas, and wraps them in notation and terminology that makes it more convenient to work with. The most important difference is that the free associative algebra used in the above is narrowed to the tensor algebra, so that the product of symbols is understood to be the tensor product. The commutation relations are imposed by constructing a quotient space of the tensor algebra quotiented by the smallest two-sided ideal containing elements of the form $x_i x_j -x_j x_i-\Sigma c_{ijk}x_k$. The universal enveloping algebra is the "largest" unital associative algebra generated by elements of $\mathfrak g$ with a Lie bracket compatible with the original Lie algebra.

== Formal definition ==
Recall that every Lie algebra $\mathfrak{g}$ is in particular a vector space. Thus, one is free to construct the tensor algebra $T(\mathfrak{g})$ from it. The tensor algebra is a free algebra: it simply contains all possible tensor products of all possible vectors in $\mathfrak{g}$, without any restrictions whatsoever on those products.

That is, one constructs the space

$$T(\mathfrak{g}) = K \,\oplus\, \mathfrak{g} \,\oplus\, (\mathfrak{g} \otimes \mathfrak{g})
\,\oplus\, (\mathfrak{g} \otimes \mathfrak{g} \otimes \mathfrak{g}) \,\oplus\, \cdots$$

where $\otimes$ is the tensor product, and $\oplus$ is the direct sum of vector spaces. Here, K is the field over which the Lie algebra is defined. From here, through to the remainder of this article, the tensor product is always explicitly shown. Many authors omit it, since, with practice, its location can usually be inferred from context. Here, a very explicit approach is adopted, to minimize any possible confusion about the meanings of expressions.

The first step in the construction is to "lift" the Lie bracket from the Lie algebra $\mathfrak{g}$ (where it is defined) to the tensor algebra $T(\mathfrak{g})$ (where it is not), so that one can coherently work with the Lie bracket of two tensors. The lifting is done recursively. Let us define

$$[a\otimes b, c] = a \otimes [b,c] + [a,c]\otimes b$$

and

$$[a, b\otimes c] = [a,b]\otimes c + b\otimes [a,c]$$

It is straightforward to verify that the above definition is bilinear and skew-symmetric; one can also show that it obeys the Jacobi identity. The final result is that one has a Lie bracket that is consistently defined on all of $T(\mathfrak{g});$ one says that it has been "lifted" to all of $T(\mathfrak{g})$ in the conventional sense of a "lift" from a base space (here, the Lie algebra) to a covering space (here, the tensor algebra).

The result of this lifting is that $T(\mathfrak{g})$ becomes a Poisson algebra: a unital associative algebra with a Lie bracket that is compatible with the original Lie algebra bracket (by construction). It is not the smallest such algebra, however; it contains far more elements than needed. One can get something smaller by projecting back down. The universal enveloping algebra $U(\mathfrak{g})$ of $\mathfrak{g}$ is defined as the quotient space

$$U(\mathfrak{g}) = T(\mathfrak{g})/\sim$$

where the equivalence relation $\sim$ is given by

$$a\otimes b - b \otimes a  \sim  [a,b]$$

for all $a,b\in T(\mathfrak{g})$. That is, the Lie bracket defines the equivalence relation used to perform the quotienting. The result is still a unital associative algebra, and one can still take the Lie bracket of any two members. Computing the result is straight-forward, if one keeps in mind that each element of $U(\mathfrak{g})$ can be understood as a coset: one just takes the bracket as usual, and searches for the coset that contains the result. It is the smallest such algebra; one cannot find anything smaller that still obeys the axioms of an associative algebra.

The universal enveloping algebra is what remains of the tensor algebra after modding out the Poisson algebra structure. (This is a non-trivial statement; the tensor algebra has a rather complicated structure: it is, among other things, a Hopf algebra; the Poisson algebra is likewise rather complicated, with many peculiar properties. It is compatible with the tensor algebra, and so the modding can be performed. The Hopf algebra structure is conserved; this is what leads to its many novel applications, e.g. in string theory. However, for the purposes of the formal definition, none of this particularly matters.)

The construction can be performed in a slightly different (but equivalent) way. Consider the two-sided ideal I generated by elements of the form

$$a\otimes b - b \otimes a - [a,b]$$

for $a,b\in\mathfrak{g}$. (Note that these generators are elements of $\mathfrak{g} \oplus (\mathfrak{g}\otimes\mathfrak{g}) \subset T(\mathfrak{g})$.) A general member of the ideal I will be linear combinations of elements of the form

$$\cdots \otimes c \otimes d \otimes (a\otimes b - b \otimes a - [a,b]) \otimes f \otimes g \otimes \cdots$$

where all lower-case letters are elements of $\mathfrak{g}$. Since I is an ideal, we can quotient by it. The universal enveloping algebra can then be defined as

$$U(\mathfrak{g}) = T(\mathfrak{g})/I$$

=== Superalgebras and other generalizations ===
The above construction focuses on Lie algebras and on the Lie bracket, and its skewness and antisymmetry. To some degree, these properties are incidental to the construction. Consider instead some (arbitrary) algebra (not a Lie algebra) over a vector space, that is, a vector space $V$ endowed with multiplication $m:V\times V\to V$ that takes elements $a\times b\mapsto m(a,b).$ If the multiplication is bilinear, then the same construction and definitions can go through. One starts by lifting $m$ up to $T(V)$ so that the lifted $m$ obeys all of the same properties that the base $m$ does – symmetry or antisymmetry or whatever. The lifting is done exactly as before, starting with

$$\begin{align}
m: V \otimes V &\to V \\
a \otimes b &\mapsto m(a,b)
\end{align}$$

This is consistent precisely because the tensor product is bilinear, and the multiplication is bilinear. The rest of the lift is performed so as to preserve multiplication as a homomorphism. By definition, one writes

$$m(a \otimes b,c)= a \otimes m(b,c) + m(a,c) \otimes b$$

and also that

$$m(a,b\otimes c)= m(a,b) \otimes c + b \otimes m(a,c)$$

This extension is consistent by appeal to a lemma on free objects: since the tensor algebra is a free algebra, any homomorphism on its generating set can be extended to the entire algebra. Everything else proceeds as described above: upon completion, one has a unital associative algebra; one can take a quotient in either of the two ways described above.

The above is exactly how the universal enveloping algebra for Lie superalgebras is constructed. One need only to carefully keep track of the sign, when permuting elements. In this case, the (anti-)commutator of the superalgebra lifts to an (anti-)commuting Poisson bracket.

Another possibility is to use something other than the tensor algebra as the covering algebra. One such possibility is to use the exterior algebra; that is, to replace every occurrence of the tensor product by the exterior product. If the base algebra is a Lie algebra, then the result is the Gerstenhaber algebra; it is the exterior algebra of the corresponding Lie group. As before, it has a grading naturally coming from the grading on the exterior algebra. (The Gerstenhaber algebra should not be confused with the Poisson superalgebra; both invoke anticommutation, but in different ways.)

The construction has also been generalized for Malcev algebras, Bol algebras and left alternative algebras.

== Universal property ==
The universal enveloping algebra, or rather the universal enveloping algebra together with the canonical map $h\colon\mathfrak{g}\to U(\mathfrak{g})$, possesses a universal property. Suppose we have any Lie algebra map

$$\varphi: \mathfrak{g} \to A$$

to a unital associative algebra A (with Lie bracket in A given by the commutator). More explicitly, this means that we assume

$$\varphi([X,Y])=\varphi(X)\varphi(Y)-\varphi(Y)\varphi(X)$$

for all $X,Y\in\mathfrak{g}$. Then there exists a unique unital algebra homomorphism

$$\widehat\varphi\colon U(\mathfrak{g}) \to A$$

such that

$$\varphi = \widehat \varphi \circ h$$

where $h:\mathfrak{g}\to U(\mathfrak{g})$ is the canonical map. (The map $h$ is obtained by embedding $\mathfrak{g}$ into its tensor algebra and then composing with the quotient map to the universal enveloping algebra. This map is an embedding, by the Poincaré–Birkhoff–Witt theorem.)

To put it differently, if $\varphi\colon\mathfrak{g}\rightarrow A$ is a linear map into a unital algebra $A$ satisfying $\varphi([X,Y])=\varphi(X)\varphi(Y)-\varphi(Y)\varphi(X)$, then $\varphi$ extends to an algebra homomorphism of $\widehat\varphi: U(\mathfrak{g}) \to A$. Since $U(\mathfrak{g})$ is generated by elements of $\mathfrak{g}$, the map $\widehat{\varphi}$ must be uniquely determined by the requirement that

$$\widehat{\varphi}(X_{i_1}\cdots X_{i_N})=\varphi(X_{i_1})\cdots \varphi(X_{i_N}),\quad X_{i_j}\in\mathfrak{g}$$.

The point is that because there are no other relations in the universal enveloping algebra besides those coming from the commutation relations of $\mathfrak{g}$, the map $\widehat{\varphi}$ is well defined, independent of how one writes a given element $x\in U(\mathfrak{g})$ as a linear combination of products of Lie algebra elements.

The universal property of the enveloping algebra immediately implies that every representation of $\mathfrak{g}$ acting on a vector space $V$ extends uniquely to a representation of $U(\mathfrak{g})$. (Take $A=\mathrm{End}(V)$.) This observation is important because it allows (as discussed below) the Casimir elements to act on $V$. These operators (from the center of $U(\mathfrak{g})$) act as scalars and provide important information about the representations. The quadratic Casimir element is of particular importance in this regard.

=== Other algebras ===
Although the canonical construction, given above, can be applied to other algebras, the result, in general, does not have the universal property. Thus, for example, when the construction is applied to Jordan algebras, the resulting enveloping algebra contains the special Jordan algebras, but not the exceptional ones: that is, it does not envelope the Albert algebras. Likewise, the Poincaré–Birkhoff–Witt theorem, below, constructs a basis for an enveloping algebra; it just won't be universal. Similar remarks hold for the Lie superalgebras.

== Poincaré–Birkhoff–Witt theorem ==
The Poincaré–Birkhoff–Witt theorem gives a precise description of $U(\mathfrak{g})$. This can be done in either one of two different ways: either by reference to an explicit vector basis on the Lie algebra, or in a coordinate-free fashion.

=== Using basis elements ===
One way is to suppose that the Lie algebra can be given a totally ordered basis, that is, it is the free vector space of a totally ordered set. Recall that a free vector space is defined as the space of all finitely supported functions from a set X to the field K (finitely supported means that only finitely many values are non-zero); it can be given a basis $e_a:X\to K$ such that $e_a(b) = \delta_{ab}$ is the indicator function for $a,b\in X$. Let $h:\mathfrak{g}\to T(\mathfrak{g})$ be the injection into the tensor algebra; this is used to give the tensor algebra a basis as well. This is done by lifting: given some arbitrary sequence of $e_a$, one defines the extension of $h$ to be

$$h(e_a\otimes e_b \otimes\cdots \otimes e_c) = h(e_a) \otimes h(e_b) \otimes\cdots \otimes h(e_c)$$

The Poincaré–Birkhoff–Witt theorem then states that one can obtain a basis for $U(\mathfrak{g})$ from the above, by enforcing the total order of X onto the algebra. That is, $U(\mathfrak{g})$ has a basis

$$e_a\otimes e_b \otimes\cdots \otimes e_c$$

where $a\le b \le \cdots \le c$, the ordering being that of total order on the set X. The proof of the theorem involves noting that, if one starts with out-of-order basis elements, these can always be swapped by using the commutator (together with the structure constants). The hard part of the proof is establishing that the final result is unique and independent of the order in which the swaps were performed.

This basis should be easily recognized as the basis of a symmetric algebra. That is, the underlying vector spaces of $U(\mathfrak{g})$ and the symmetric algebra are isomorphic, and it is the PBW theorem that shows that this is so. See, however, the section on the algebra of symbols, below, for a more precise statement of the nature of the isomorphism.

It is useful, perhaps, to split the process into two steps. In the first step, one constructs the free Lie algebra: this is what one gets, if one mods out by all commutators, without specifying what the values of the commutators are. The second step is to apply the specific commutation relations from $\mathfrak{g}.$ The first step is universal, and does not depend on the specific $\mathfrak{g}.$ It can also be precisely defined: the basis elements are given by Hall words, a special case of which are the Lyndon words; these are explicitly constructed to behave appropriately as commutators.

=== Coordinate-free ===
One can also state the theorem in a coordinate-free fashion, avoiding the use of total orders and basis elements. This is convenient when there are difficulties in defining the basis vectors, as there can be for infinite-dimensional Lie algebras. It also gives a more natural form that is more easily extended to other kinds of algebras. This is accomplished by constructing a filtration $U_m \mathfrak{g}$ whose limit is the universal enveloping algebra $U(\mathfrak{g}).$

First, a notation is needed for an ascending sequence of subspaces of the tensor algebra. Let

$$T_m\mathfrak{g} = K\oplus \mathfrak{g}\oplus T^2\mathfrak{g} \oplus \cdots \oplus T^m\mathfrak{g}$$

where

$$T^m\mathfrak{g} = T^{\otimes m} \mathfrak{g} = \mathfrak{g}\otimes \cdots \otimes \mathfrak{g}$$

is the m-times tensor product of $\mathfrak{g}.$ The $T_m\mathfrak{g}$ form a filtration:

$$K\subset \mathfrak{g}\subset T_2\mathfrak{g} \subset \cdots \subset T_m\mathfrak{g} \subset\cdots$$

More precisely, this is a filtered algebra, since the filtration preserves the algebraic properties of the subspaces. Note that the limit of this filtration is the tensor algebra $T(\mathfrak{g}).$

It was already established, above, that quotienting by the ideal is a natural transformation that takes one from $T(\mathfrak{g})$ to $U(\mathfrak{g}).$ This also works naturally on the subspaces, and so one obtains a filtration $U_m \mathfrak{g}$ whose limit is the universal enveloping algebra $U(\mathfrak{g}).$

Next, define the space

$$G_m\mathfrak{g} = U_m \mathfrak{g}/U_{m-1} \mathfrak{g}$$

This is the space $U_m \mathfrak{g}$ modulo all of the subspaces $U_n \mathfrak{g}$ of strictly smaller filtration degree. Note that $G_m\mathfrak{g}$ is not at all the same as the leading term $U^m\mathfrak{g}$ of the filtration, as one might naively surmise. It is not constructed through a set subtraction mechanism associated with the filtration.

Quotienting $U_m \mathfrak{g}$ by $U_{m-1} \mathfrak{g}$ has the effect of setting all Lie commutators defined in $U_m \mathfrak{g}$ to zero. One can see this by observing that the commutator of a pair of elements whose products lie in $U_{m} \mathfrak{g}$ actually gives an element in $U_{m-1} \mathfrak{g}$. This is perhaps not immediately obvious: to get this result, one must repeatedly apply the commutation relations, and turn the crank. The essence of the Poincaré–Birkhoff–Witt theorem is that it is always possible to do this, and that the result is unique.

Since commutators of elements whose products are defined in $U_{m} \mathfrak{g}$ lie in $U_{m-1} \mathfrak{g}$, the quotienting that defines $G_m\mathfrak{g}$ has the effect of setting all commutators to zero. What PBW states is that the commutator of elements in $G_m\mathfrak{g}$ is necessarily zero. What is left are the elements that are not expressible as commutators.

In this way, one is lead immediately to the symmetric algebra. This is the algebra where all commutators vanish. It can be defined as a filtration $S_m \mathfrak{g}$ of symmetric tensor products $\operatorname{Sym}^m \mathfrak{g}$. Its limit is the symmetric algebra $S(\mathfrak{g})$. It is constructed by appeal to the same notion of naturality as before. One starts with the same tensor algebra, and just uses a different ideal, the ideal that makes all elements commute:

$$S(\mathfrak{g}) = T(\mathfrak{g}) / (a\otimes b - b\otimes a)$$

Thus, one can view the Poincaré–Birkhoff–Witt theorem as stating that $G(\mathfrak{g})$ is isomorphic to the symmetric algebra $S(\mathfrak{g})$, both as a vector space and as a commutative algebra.

The $G_m\mathfrak{g}$ also form a filtered algebra; its limit is $G(\mathfrak{g}).$ This is the associated graded algebra of the filtration.

The construction above, due to its use of quotienting, implies that the limit of $G(\mathfrak{g})$ is isomorphic to $U(\mathfrak{g}).$ In more general settings, with loosened conditions, one finds that $S(\mathfrak{g})\to G(\mathfrak{g})$ is a projection, and one then gets PBW-type theorems for the associated graded algebra of a filtered algebra. To emphasize this, the notation $\operatorname{gr}U(\mathfrak{g})$ is sometimes used for $G(\mathfrak{g}),$ serving to remind that it is the filtered algebra.

=== Other algebras ===
The theorem, applied to Jordan algebras, yields the exterior algebra, rather than the symmetric algebra. In essence, the construction zeros out the anti-commutators. The resulting algebra is an enveloping algebra, but is not universal. As mentioned above, it fails to envelop the exceptional Jordan algebras.

== Left-invariant differential operators ==
Suppose $G$ is a real Lie group with Lie algebra $\mathfrak{g}$. Following the modern approach, we may identify $\mathfrak{g}$ with the space of left-invariant vector fields (i.e., first-order left-invariant differential operators). Specifically, if we initially think of $\mathfrak{g}$ as the tangent space to $G$ at the identity, then each vector in $\mathfrak{g}$ has a unique left-invariant extension. We then identify the vector in the tangent space with the associated left-invariant vector field. Now, the commutator (as differential operators) of two left-invariant vector fields is again a vector field and again left-invariant. We can then define the bracket operation on $\mathfrak{g}$ as the commutator on the associated left-invariant vector fields. This definition agrees with any other standard definition of the bracket structure on the Lie algebra of a Lie group.

We may then consider left-invariant differential operators of arbitrary order. Every such operator $A$ can be expressed (non-uniquely) as a linear combination of products of left-invariant vector fields. The collection of all left-invariant differential operators on $G$ forms an algebra, denoted $D(G)$. It can be shown that $D(G)$ is isomorphic to the universal enveloping algebra $U(\mathfrak{g})$.

In the case that $\mathfrak{g}$ arises as the Lie algebra of a real Lie group, one can use left-invariant differential operators to give an analytic proof of the Poincaré–Birkhoff–Witt theorem. Specifically, the algebra $D(G)$ of left-invariant differential operators is generated by elements (the left-invariant vector fields) that satisfy the commutation relations of $\mathfrak{g}$. Thus, by the universal property of the enveloping algebra, $D(G)$ is a quotient of $U(\mathfrak{g})$. Thus, if the PBW basis elements are linearly independent in $D(G)$—which one can establish analytically—they must certainly be linearly independent in $U(\mathfrak{g})$. (And, at this point, the isomorphism of $D(G)$ with $U(\mathfrak{g})$ is apparent.)

== Algebra of symbols ==
The underlying vector space of $S(\mathfrak{g})$ may be given a new algebra structure so that $U(\mathfrak{g})$ and $S(\mathfrak{g})$ are isomorphic as associative algebras. This leads to the concept of the algebra of symbols $\star(\mathfrak{g})$: the space of symmetric polynomials, endowed with a product, the $\star$, that places the algebraic structure of the Lie algebra onto what is otherwise a standard associative algebra. That is, what the PBW theorem obscures (the commutation relations) the algebra of symbols restores into the spotlight.

The algebra is obtained by taking elements of $S(\mathfrak{g})$ and replacing each generator $e_i$ by an indeterminate, commuting variable $t_i$ to obtain the space of symmetric polynomials $K[t_i]$ over the field $K$. Indeed, the correspondence is trivial: one simply substitutes the symbol $t_i$ for $e_i$. The resulting polynomial is called the symbol of the corresponding element of $S(\mathfrak{g})$. The inverse map is

$$w: \star(\mathfrak{g})\to U(\mathfrak{g})$$

that replaces each symbol $t_i$ by $e_i$. The algebraic structure is obtained by requiring that the product $\star$ act as an isomorphism, that is, so that

$$w(p \star q) = w(p)\otimes w(q)$$

for polynomials $p,q\in \star(\mathfrak{g}).$

The primary issue with this construction is that $w(p)\otimes w(q)$ is not trivially, inherently a member of $U(\mathfrak{g})$, as written, and that one must first perform a tedious reshuffling of the basis elements (applying the structure constants as needed) to obtain an element of $U(\mathfrak{g})$ in the properly ordered basis. An explicit expression for this product can be given: this is the Berezin formula. It follows essentially from the Baker–Campbell–Hausdorff formula for the product of two elements of a Lie group.

A closed form expression is given by

$$p(t)\star q(t)= \left. \exp\left(t_i
m^i \left(\frac{\partial}{\partial u}, \frac{\partial}{\partial v} \right)
\right) p(u)q(v)\right \vert_{u=v=t}$$

where

$$m(A,B)=\log\left(e^Ae^B\right)-A-B$$

and $m^i$ is just $m$ in the chosen basis.

The universal enveloping algebra of the Heisenberg algebra is the Weyl algebra (modulo the relation that the center be the unit); here, the $\star$ product is called the Moyal product.

== Representation theory ==
The universal enveloping algebra preserves the representation theory: the representations of $\mathfrak{g}$ correspond in a one-to-one manner to the modules over $U(\mathfrak{g})$. In more abstract terms, the abelian category of all representations of $\mathfrak{g}$ is isomorphic to the abelian category of all left modules over $U(\mathfrak{g})$.

The representation theory of semisimple Lie algebras rests on the observation that there is an isomorphism, known as the Kronecker product:

$$U(\mathfrak{g}_1\oplus\mathfrak{g}_2)\cong U(\mathfrak{g}_1)\otimes U(\mathfrak{g}_2)$$

for Lie algebras $\mathfrak{g}_1, \mathfrak{g}_2$. The isomorphism follows from a lifting of the embedding

$$i(\mathfrak{g}_1 \oplus \mathfrak{g}_2)
=i_1(\mathfrak{g}_1)\otimes 1 \oplus 1\otimes i_2(\mathfrak{g}_2)$$

where

$$i:\mathfrak{g}\to U(\mathfrak{g})$$

is just the canonical embedding (with subscripts, respectively for algebras one and two). It is straightforward to verify that this embedding lifts, given the prescription above. See, however, the discussion of the bialgebra structure in the article on tensor algebras for a review of some of the finer points of doing so: in particular, the shuffle product employed there corresponds to the Wigner-Racah coefficients, i.e. the 6j and 9j-symbols, etc.

Also important is that the universal enveloping algebra of a free Lie algebra is isomorphic to the free associative algebra.

Construction of representations typically proceeds by building the Verma modules of the highest weights.

In a typical context where $\mathfrak{g}$ is acting by infinitesimal transformations, the elements of $U(\mathfrak{g})$ act like differential operators, of all orders. (See, for example, the realization of the universal enveloping algebra as left-invariant differential operators on the associated group, as discussed above.)

== Casimir operators ==
The center $Z(U(\mathfrak{g}))$ of $U(\mathfrak{g})$ can be identified with the centralizer of $\mathfrak{g}$ in $U(\mathfrak{g}).$ Any element of $Z(U(\mathfrak{g}))$ must commute with all of $U(\mathfrak{g}),$ and in particular with the canonical embedding of $\mathfrak{g}$ into $U({\mathfrak {g}}).$ Because of this, the center is directly useful for classifying representations of $\mathfrak{g}$. For a finite-dimensional semisimple Lie algebra, the Casimir operators form a distinguished basis from the center $Z(U(\mathfrak{g}))$. These may be constructed as follows.

The center $Z(U(\mathfrak{g}))$ corresponds to linear combinations of all elements $z=v\otimes w \otimes \cdots \otimes u \in U(\mathfrak{g})$ that commute with all elements $x\in \mathfrak{g};$ that is, for which $[z,x]=\mbox{ad}_x(z)=0.$ That is, they are in the kernel of $\mbox{ad}_\mathfrak{g}.$ Thus, a technique is needed for computing that kernel. What we have is the action of the adjoint representation on $\mathfrak{g};$ we need it on $U(\mathfrak{g}).$ The easiest route is to note that $\mbox{ad}_\mathfrak{g}$ is a derivation, and that the space of derivations can be lifted to $T(\mathfrak{g})$ and thus to $U(\mathfrak{g}).$ This implies that both of these are differential algebras.

By definition, $\delta:\mathfrak{g}\to\mathfrak{g}$ is a derivation on $\mathfrak{g}$ if it obeys Leibniz's law:

$$\delta([v,w])=[\delta(v),w]+[v,\delta(w)]$$

(When $\mathfrak{g}$ is the space of left invariant vector fields on a group $G$, the Lie bracket is that of vector fields.) The lifting is performed by defining

$$\begin{align}\delta(v\otimes w \otimes \cdots \otimes u)
=& \, \delta(v) \otimes w \otimes \cdots \otimes u \\
&+ v\otimes \delta(w) \otimes \cdots\otimes u \\
&+ \cdots + v\otimes w \otimes \cdots \otimes \delta(u).
\end{align}$$

Since $\mbox{ad}_x$ is a derivation for any $x\in\mathfrak{g},$ the above defines $\mbox{ad}_x$ acting on $T(\mathfrak{g})$ and $U(\mathfrak{g}).$

From the PBW theorem, it is clear that all central elements are linear combinations of symmetric homogeneous polynomials in the basis elements $e_a$ of the Lie algebra. The Casimir invariants are the irreducible homogeneous polynomials of a given, fixed degree. That is, given a basis $e_a$, a Casimir operator of order $m$ has the form

$$C_{(m)} = \kappa^{ab\cdots c}e_a\otimes e_b\otimes \cdots\otimes e_c$$

where there are $m$ terms in the tensor product, and $\kappa^{ab\cdots c}$ is a completely symmetric tensor of order $m$ belonging to the adjoint representation. That is, $\kappa^{ab\cdots c}$ can be (should be) thought of as an element of $\left(\operatorname{ad}_\mathfrak{g}\right)^{\otimes m}.$ Recall that the adjoint representation is given directly by the structure constants, and so an explicit indexed form of the above equations can be given, in terms of the Lie algebra basis; this is originally a theorem of Israel Gel'fand. That is, from $[x,C_{(m)}]=0$, it follows that

$$f_{ij}^{\;\; k} \kappa^{jl\cdots m}
+ f_{ij}^{\;\; l} \kappa^{kj\cdots m} + \cdots
+ f_{ij}^{\;\; m} \kappa^{kl\cdots j} = 0$$

where the structure constants are

$$[e_i,e_j]=f_{ij}^{\;\; k}e_k$$

As an example, the quadratic Casimir operator is

$$C_{(2)} = \kappa^{ij} e_i\otimes e_j$$

where $\kappa^{ij}$ is the inverse matrix of the Killing form $\kappa_{ij}.$ That the Casimir operator $C_{(2)}$ belongs to the center $Z(U(\mathfrak{g}))$ follows from the fact that the Killing form is invariant under the adjoint action.

The center of the universal enveloping algebra of a simple Lie algebra is given in detail by the Harish-Chandra isomorphism.

=== Rank ===
The number of algebraically independent Casimir operators of a finite-dimensional semisimple Lie algebra is equal to the rank of that algebra, i.e. is equal to the rank of the Cartan–Weyl basis. This may be seen as follows. For a d-dimensional vector space V, recall that the determinant is the completely antisymmetric tensor on $V^{\otimes d}$. Given a matrix M, one may write the characteristic polynomial of M as

$$\det(tI-M)=\sum_{n=0}^d p_nt^n$$

For a d-dimensional Lie algebra, that is, an algebra whose adjoint representation is d-dimensional, the linear operator

$$\operatorname{ad}:\mathfrak{g}\to\operatorname{End}(\mathfrak{g})$$

implies that $\operatorname{ad}_x$ is a d-dimensional endomorphism, and so one has the characteristic equation

$$\det(tI-\operatorname{ad}_x)=\sum_{n=0}^d p_n(x)t^n$$

for elements $x\in \mathfrak{g}.$ The non-zero roots of this characteristic polynomial (that are roots for all x) form the root system of the algebra. In general, there are only r such roots; this is the rank of the algebra. This implies that the highest value of n for which the $p_n(x)$ is non-vanishing is r.

The $p_n(x)$ are homogeneous polynomials of degree d − n. This can be seen in several ways: Given a constant $k\in K$, ad is linear, so that $\operatorname{ad}_{kx}=k\,\operatorname{ad}_x.$ By plugging and chugging in the above, one obtains that

$$p_n(kx)=k^{d-n}p_n(x).$$

By linearity, if one expands in the basis,

$$x=\sum_{i=1}^d x_i e_i$$

then the polynomial has the form

$$p_n(x)=x_ax_b\cdots x_c \kappa^{ab\cdots c}$$

that is, a $\kappa$ is a tensor of rank $m=d-n$. By linearity and the commutativity of addition, i.e. that $\operatorname{ad}_{x+y}=\operatorname{ad}_{y+x},$, one concludes that this tensor must be completely symmetric. This tensor is exactly the Casimir invariant of order m.

The center $Z(\mathfrak{g})$ corresponded to those elements $z\in Z(\mathfrak{g})$ for which $\operatorname{ad}_x(z)=0$ for all x; by the above, these clearly corresponds to the roots of the characteristic equation. One concludes that the roots form a space of rank r and that the Casimir invariants span this space. That is, the Casimir invariants generate the center $Z(U(\mathfrak{g})).$

=== Example: Rotation group SO(3) ===
The rotation group SO(3) is of rank one, and thus has one Casimir operator. It is three-dimensional, and thus the Casimir operator must have order (3 − 1) = 2 i.e. be quadratic. Of course, this is the Lie algebra of $A_1.$ As an elementary exercise, one can compute this directly. Changing notation to $e_i=L_i,$ with $L_i$ belonging to the adjoint rep, a general algebra element is $xL_1+yL_2+zL_3$ and direct computation gives

$$\det\left(xL_1+yL_2+zL_3-tI\right)=-t^3-(x^2+y^2+z^2)t$$

The quadratic term can be read off as $\kappa^{ij}=\delta^{ij}$, and so the squared angular momentum operator for the rotation group is that Casimir operator. That is,

$$C_{(2)} = L^2 = e_1\otimes e_1 +  e_2\otimes e_2 + e_3\otimes e_3$$

and explicit computation shows that

$$[L^2, e_k]=0$$

after making use of the structure constants

$$[e_i, e_j]=\varepsilon_{ij}^{\;\;k}e_k$$

=== Example: Pseudo-differential operators ===
A key observation during the construction of $U(\mathfrak{g})$ above was that it was a differential algebra, by dint of the fact that any derivation on the Lie algebra can be lifted to $U(\mathfrak{g})$. Thus, one is led to a ring of pseudo-differential operators, from which one can construct Casimir invariants.

If the Lie algebra $\mathfrak{g}$ acts on a space of linear operators, such as in Fredholm theory, then one can construct Casimir invariants on the corresponding space of operators. The quadratic Casimir operator corresponds to an elliptic operator.

If the Lie algebra acts on a differentiable manifold, then each Casimir operator corresponds to a higher-order differential on the cotangent manifold, the second-order differential being the most common and most important.

If the action of the algebra is isometric, as would be the case for Riemannian or pseudo-Riemannian manifolds endowed with a metric and the symmetry groups SO(N) and SO (P, Q), respectively, one can then contract upper and lower indices (with the metric tensor) to obtain more interesting structures. For the quadratic Casimir invariant, this is the Laplacian. Quartic Casimir operators allow one to square the stress–energy tensor, giving rise to the Yang-Mills action. The Coleman–Mandula theorem restricts the form that these can take, when one considers ordinary Lie algebras. However, the Lie superalgebras are able to evade the premises of the Coleman–Mandula theorem, and can be used to mix together space and internal symmetries.

== Examples in particular cases ==
If $\mathfrak{g} = \mathfrak{sl}_2$, then it has a basis of matrices

$$H = \begin{pmatrix}
-1 & 0 \\
0 & 1
\end{pmatrix}, \text{ }
E = \begin{pmatrix}
0 & 1 \\
0 & 0
\end{pmatrix}, \text{ }
F = \begin{pmatrix}
0 & 0 \\
1 & 0
\end{pmatrix}$$

which satisfy the following identities under the standard bracket:

$[H,E] = -2E$, $[H,F] = 2F$, and $[E,F] = - H$

this shows us that the universal enveloping algebra has the presentation

$U(\mathfrak{sl}_2) = \frac{\mathbb{C}\langle x,y,z\rangle}{(xy - yx + 2y, xz - zx - 2z, yz - zy + x)}$

as a non-commutative ring.

If $\mathfrak{g}$ is abelian (that is, the bracket is always 0), then $U(\mathfrak{g})$ is commutative; and if a basis of the vector space $\mathfrak{g}$ has been chosen, then $U(\mathfrak{g})$ can be identified with the polynomial algebra over K, with one variable per basis element.

If $\mathfrak{g}$ is the Lie algebra corresponding to the Lie group G, then $U(\mathfrak{g})$ can be identified with the algebra of left-invariant differential operators (of all orders) on G; with $\mathfrak{g}$ lying inside it as the left-invariant vector fields as first-order differential operators.

To relate the above two cases: if $\mathfrak{g}$ is a vector space V as abelian Lie algebra, the left-invariant differential operators are the constant coefficient operators, which are indeed a polynomial algebra in the partial derivatives of first order.

The center $Z(\mathfrak{g})$ consists of the left- and right- invariant differential operators; this, in the case of G not commutative, is often not generated by first-order operators (see for example Casimir operator of a semi-simple Lie algebra).

Another characterization in Lie group theory is of $U(\mathfrak{g})$ as the convolution algebra of distributions supported only at the identity element e of G.

The algebra of differential operators in n variables with polynomial coefficients may be obtained starting with the Lie algebra of the Heisenberg group. See Weyl algebra for this; one must take a quotient, so that the central elements of the Lie algebra act as prescribed scalars.

The universal enveloping algebra of a finite-dimensional Lie algebra is a filtered quadratic algebra.

== Hopf algebras and quantum groups ==
The construction of the group algebra for a given group is in many ways analogous to constructing the universal enveloping algebra for a given Lie algebra. Both constructions are universal and translate representation theory into module theory. Furthermore, both group algebras and universal enveloping algebras carry natural comultiplications that turn them into Hopf algebras. This is made precise in the article on the tensor algebra: the tensor algebra has a Hopf algebra structure on it, and because the Lie bracket is consistent with (obeys the consistency conditions for) that Hopf structure, it is inherited by the universal enveloping algebra.

Given a Lie group G, one can construct the vector space C(G) of continuous complex-valued functions on G, and turn it into a C*-algebra. This algebra has a natural Hopf algebra structure: given two functions $\varphi, \psi\in C(G)$, one defines multiplication as

$$(\nabla(\varphi, \psi))(x)=\varphi(x)\psi(x)$$

and comultiplication as

$$(\Delta(\varphi))(x\otimes y)=\varphi(xy),$$

the counit as

$$\varepsilon(\varphi)=\varphi(e)$$

and the antipode as

$$(S(\varphi))(x)=\varphi(x^{-1}).$$

Now, the Gelfand–Naimark theorem essentially states that every commutative Hopf algebra is isomorphic to the Hopf algebra of continuous functions on some compact topological group G—the theory of compact topological groups and the theory of commutative Hopf algebras are the same. For Lie groups, this implies that C(G) is isomorphically dual to $U(\mathfrak{g})$; more precisely, it is isomorphic to a subspace of the dual space $U^*(\mathfrak{g}).$

These ideas can then be extended to the non-commutative case. One starts by defining the quasi-triangular Hopf algebras, and then performing what is called a quantum deformation to obtain the quantum universal enveloping algebra, or quantum group, for short.

== See also ==
- Milnor–Moore theorem
- Harish-Chandra homomorphism
