= Roger Lyndon =

American mathematician

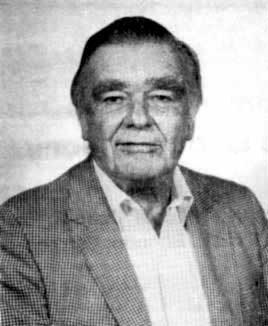
Roger Lyndon

Roger Conant Lyndon (December 18, 1917 – June 8, 1988) was an American mathematician, for many years a professor at the University of Michigan. He is known for Lyndon words, the Curtis–Hedlund–Lyndon theorem, Craig–Lyndon interpolation and the Lyndon–Hochschild–Serre spectral sequence.

== Biography ==
Lyndon was born on December 18, 1917, in Calais, Maine, the son of a Unitarian minister. His mother died when he was two years old, after which he and his father moved several times to towns in Massachusetts and New York. He did his undergraduate studies at Harvard University, originally intending to study literature but eventually settling on mathematics, and graduated in 1939. He took a job as a banker, but soon afterwards returned to graduate school at Harvard, earning a master's degree in 1941. After a brief teaching stint at the Georgia Institute of Technology, he returned to Harvard for the third time in 1942 and while there taught navigation as part of the V-12 Navy College Training Program while earning his Ph.D. He received his doctorate in 1946 under the supervision of Saunders Mac Lane.

After graduating from Harvard, Lyndon worked at the Office of Naval Research and then for five years as an instructor and assistant professor at Princeton University before moving to the University of Michigan in 1953. At Michigan, he shared an office with Donald G. Higman; his notable doctoral students there included Kenneth Appel and Joseph Kruskal.

Lyndon died on June 8, 1988, in Ann Arbor, Michigan.

== Research ==
Lyndon's Ph.D. thesis concerned group cohomology; the Lyndon–Hochschild–Serre spectral sequence, coming out of that work, relates a group's cohomology to the cohomologies of its normal subgroups and their quotient groups.

A Lyndon word is a nonempty string of symbols that is smaller, lexicographically, than any of its cyclic rotations; Lyndon introduced these words in 1954 while studying the bases of free groups.

Lyndon was credited by Gustav A. Hedlund for his role in the discovery of the Curtis–Hedlund–Lyndon theorem, a mathematical characterization of cellular automata in terms of continuous equivariant functions on shift spaces.

The Craig–Lyndon interpolation theorem in formal logic states that every logical implication can be factored into the composition of two implications, such that each nonlogical symbol in the middle formula of the composition is also used in both of the other two formulas. A version of the theorem was proved by William Craig in 1957, and strengthened by Lyndon in 1959.

In addition to these results, Lyndon made important contributions to combinatorial group theory, the study of groups in terms of their presentations in terms of sequences of generating elements that combine to form the group identity.

== Awards and honors ==
The book Contributions to Group Theory (American Mathematical Society, 1984, ISBN 978-0-8218-5035-0) is a festschrift dedicated to Lyndon on the occasion of his 65th birthday; it includes five articles about Lyndon and his mathematical research, as well as 27 invited and refereed research articles.

The Roger Lyndon Collegiate Professorship of Mathematics at the University of Michigan, held by Hyman Bass in 1999–2008, is named after Lyndon.

== Publications ==
Lyndon was the author or coauthor of the books:

- Notes on Logic (Van Nostrand, 1967)
- Word Problems: Decision Problem in Group Theory (with W. W. Boone and F.B. Cannonito, North-Holland, 1973)
- Combinatorial Group Theory (with Paul Schupp, 1976, reprinted 2001 by Springer-Verlag, ISBN 978-3-540-41158-1)
- Groups and Geometry (Cambridge University Press, 1985, ISBN 978-0-521-31694-1).

Some of his most cited papers include:

- Lyndon, Roger C. (1950). "Cohomology theory of groups with a single defining relation". Annals of Mathematics. 52 (3): 650–665. doi:10.2307/1969440. JSTOR 1969440. MR 0047046.
- Chen, Kuo Tsai; Fox, Ralph H.; Lyndon, Roger C. (1958). "Free differential calculus. IV. The quotient groups of the lower central series". Annals of Mathematics. 68 (1): 81–95. doi:10.2307/1970044. JSTOR 1970044. MR 0102539.
