= Plancherel theorem for spherical functions =

Representation theory

In mathematics, the Plancherel theorem for spherical functions is an important result in the representation theory of semisimple Lie groups, due in its final form to Harish-Chandra. It is a natural generalisation in non-commutative harmonic analysis of the Plancherel formula and Fourier inversion formula in the representation theory of the group of real numbers in classical harmonic analysis and has a similarly close interconnection with the theory of differential equations. It is the special case for zonal spherical functions of the general Plancherel theorem for semisimple Lie groups, also proved by Harish-Chandra. The Plancherel theorem gives the eigenfunction expansion of radial functions for the Laplacian operator on the associated symmetric space X; it also gives the direct integral decomposition into irreducible representations of the regular representation on L^{2}(X). In the case of hyperbolic space, these expansions were known from prior results of Mehler, Weyl and Fock.

The main reference for almost all this material is the encyclopedic text of Helgason (1984).

== History ==
The first versions of an abstract Plancherel formula for the Fourier transform on a unimodular locally compact group G were due to Segal and Mautner. At around the same time, Harish-Chandra and Gelfand & Naimark derived an explicit formula for SL(2,R) and complex semisimple Lie groups, so in particular the Lorentz groups. A simpler abstract formula was derived by Mautner for a "topological" symmetric space G/K corresponding to a maximal compact subgroup K. Godement gave a more concrete and satisfactory form for positive definite spherical functions, a class of special functions on G/K. Since when G is a semisimple Lie group these spherical functions φ_{λ} were naturally labelled by a parameter λ in the quotient of a Euclidean space by the action of a finite reflection group, it became a central problem to determine explicitly the Plancherel measure in terms of this parametrization. Generalizing the ideas of Hermann Weyl from the spectral theory of ordinary differential equations, Harish-Chandra introduced his celebrated c-function c(λ) to describe the asymptotic behaviour of the spherical functions φ_{λ} and proposed c(λ)^{−2} dλ as the Plancherel measure. He verified this formula for the special cases when G is complex or real rank one, thus in particular covering the case when G/K is a hyperbolic space. The general case was reduced to two conjectures about the properties of the c-function and the so-called spherical Fourier transform. Explicit formulas for the c-function were later obtained for a large class of classical semisimple Lie groups by Bhanu-Murthy. In turn these formulas prompted Gindikin and Karpelevich to derive a product formula for the c-function, reducing the computation to Harish-Chandra's formula for the rank 1 case. Their work finally enabled Harish-Chandra to complete his proof of the Plancherel theorem for spherical functions in 1966.

In many special cases, for example for complex semisimple group or the Lorentz groups, there are simple methods to develop the theory directly. Certain subgroups of these groups can be treated by techniques generalising the well-known "method of descent" due to Jacques Hadamard. In particular Flensted-Jensen (1978) gave a general method for deducing properties of the spherical transform for a real semisimple group from that of its complexification.

One of the principal applications and motivations for the spherical transform was Selberg's trace formula. The classical Poisson summation formula combines the Fourier inversion formula on a vector group with summation over a cocompact lattice. In Selberg's analogue of this formula, the vector group is replaced by G/K, the Fourier transform by the spherical transform and the lattice by a cocompact (or cofinite) discrete subgroup. The original paper of Selberg (1956) implicitly invokes the spherical transform; it was Godement (1957) who brought the transform to the fore, giving in particular an elementary treatment for SL(2,R) along the lines sketched by Selberg.

== Spherical functions ==
Let G be a semisimple Lie group and K a maximal compact subgroup of G. The Hecke algebra C_{c}(K \G/K), consisting of compactly supported K-biinvariant continuous functions on G, acts by convolution on the Hilbert space H=L^{2}(G / K). Because G / K is a symmetric space, this *-algebra is commutative. The closure of its (the Hecke algebra's) image in the operator norm is a non-unital commutative C* algebra $\mathfrak{A}$, so by the Gelfand isomorphism can be identified with the continuous functions vanishing at infinity on its spectrum X. Points in the spectrum are given by continuous *-homomorphisms of $\mathfrak{A}$ into C, i.e. characters of $\mathfrak{A}$.

If S' denotes the commutant of a set of operators S on H, then $\mathfrak{A}^\prime$ can be identified with the commutant of the regular representation of G on H. Now $\mathfrak{A}$ leaves invariant the subspace H_{0} of K-invariant vectors in H. Moreover, the abelian von Neumann algebra it generates on H_{0} is maximal Abelian. By spectral theory, there is an essentially unique measure μ on the locally compact space X and a unitary transformation U between H_{0} and L^{2}(X, μ) which carries the operators in $\mathfrak{A}$ onto the corresponding multiplication operators.

The transformation U is called the spherical Fourier transform or sometimes just the spherical transform and μ is called the Plancherel measure. The Hilbert space H_{0} can be identified with L^{2}(K\G/K), the space of K-biinvariant square integrable functions on G.

The characters χ_{λ} of $\mathfrak{A}$ (i.e. the points of X) can be described by positive definite spherical functions φ_{λ} on G, via the formula
$$\chi_\lambda(\pi(f)) = \int_G f(g)\cdot \varphi_\lambda(g) \, dg.$$
for f in C_{c}(K\G/K), where π(f) denotes the convolution operator in $\mathfrak{A}$ and the integral is with respect to Haar measure on G.

The spherical functions φ_{λ} on G are given by Harish-Chandra's formula:

$\varphi_\lambda(g) = \int_K \lambda^\prime(gk)^{-1}\, dk.$

In this formula:

- the integral is with respect to Haar measure on K;
- λ is an element of A* =Hom(A,T) where A is the Abelian vector subgroup in the Iwasawa decomposition G =KAN of G;
- λ' is defined on G by first extending λ to a character of the solvable subgroup AN, using the group homomorphism onto A, and then setting
  $$\lambda'(kx) = \Delta_{AN}(x)^{1/2} \lambda(x)$$
  for k in K and x in AN, where Δ_{AN} is the modular function of AN.
- Two different characters λ_{1} and λ_{2} give the same spherical function if and only if λ_{1} = λ_{2}·s, where s is in the Weyl group of A
  $$W=N_K(A)/C_K(A),$$
  the quotient of the normaliser of A in K by its centraliser, a finite reflection group.

It follows that

- X can be identified with the quotient space A*/W.

== Spherical principal series ==
The spherical function φ_{λ} can be identified with the matrix coefficient of the spherical principal series of G. If M is the centraliser of A in K, this is defined as the unitary representation π_{λ} of G induced by the character of B = MAN given by the composition of the homomorphism of MAN onto A and the character λ. The induced representation is defined on functions f on G with
$$f(gb)=\Delta(b)^{1/2} \lambda(b) f(g)$$
for b in B by
$$\pi(g)f(x)=f(g^{-1}x),$$
where
$$\|f\|^2 = \int_K |f(k)|^2 \, dk < \infty.$$

The functions f can be identified with functions in L^{2}(K / M) and
$$\chi_\lambda(g)=(\pi(g)1,1).$$

As Kostant (1969) proved, the representations of the spherical principal series are irreducible and two representations π_{λ} and π_{μ} are unitarily equivalent if and only if μ = σ(λ) for some σ in the Weyl group of A.

== Example: SL(2, C) ==
The group G = SL(2,C) acts transitively on the quaternionic upper half space
$$\mathfrak{H}^3=\{x+y i + t j \mid t > 0\}$$
by Möbius transformations. The complex matrix
$$g=\begin{pmatrix} a & b \\ c& d \end{pmatrix}$$
acts as
$$g(w) = (aw+b)(cw +d)^{-1}.$$

The stabiliser of the point j is the maximal compact subgroup K = SU(2), so that $\mathfrak{H}^3 = G/K.$ It carries the G-invariant Riemannian metric

$$ds^2 =r^{-2}\left(dx^2 + dy^2 + dr^2\right)$$

with associated volume element

$$dV= r^{-3}\, dx\,dy\,dr$$

and Laplacian operator

$$\Delta = -r^2 (\partial_x^2 + \partial_y^2 + \partial_r^2) + r\partial_r.$$

Every point in $\mathfrak{H}^3$ can be written as k(e^{t}j) with k in SU(2) and t determined up to a sign. The Laplacian has the following form on functions invariant under SU(2), regarded as functions of the real parameter t:
$$\Delta= - \partial_t^2 - 2 \coth t \partial_t.$$

The integral of an SU(2)-invariant function is given by
$$\int f \, dV= \int_{-\infty}^{\infty} f(t) \, \sinh^2 t \, dt.$$

Identifying the square integrable SU(2)-invariant functions with L^{2}(R) by the unitary transformation Uf(t) = f(t) sinh t, Δ is transformed into the operator

$$U^*\Delta U = -{d^2\over dt^2} + 1.$$

By the Plancherel theorem and Fourier inversion formula for R, any SU(2)-invariant function f can be expressed in terms of the spherical functions

$$\Phi_\lambda(t)={\sin \lambda t\over \lambda \sinh t},$$

by the spherical transform

$$\tilde{f}(\lambda)=\int f \Phi_{-\lambda} \, dV$$

and the spherical inversion formula

$$f(x)=\int \tilde{f}(\lambda)\Phi_\lambda(x) \lambda^2 \,d\lambda.$$

Taking $f = f_2^* \star f_1$ with f_{i} in C_{c}(G / K) and $f^*(g) = \overline{f(g^{-1})}$, and evaluating at i yields the Plancherel formula

$$\int_G f_1\overline{f_2} \, dg = \int \tilde{f}_1(\lambda) \overline{\tilde{f}_2(\lambda)}\, \lambda^2 \, d\lambda.$$

For biinvariant functions this establishes the Plancherel theorem for spherical functions: the map

$$\begin{cases}
U: L^2(K\backslash G/K) \to L^2(\R, \lambda^2\,d\lambda) \\
U: f\longmapsto \tilde{f}
\end{cases}$$

is unitary and sends the convolution operator defined by $f\in L^1(K\backslash G/K)$ into the multiplication operator defined by $\tilde{f}$.

The spherical function Φ_{λ} is an eigenfunction of the Laplacian:

$$\Delta \Phi_\lambda= (\lambda^2 + 1) \Phi_\lambda.$$

Schwartz functions on R are the spherical transforms of functions f belonging to the Harish-Chandra Schwartz space

$$\mathcal{S} = \left \{f \left | \sup_t \left |(1+t^2)^N(I+\Delta)^M f(t)\sinh(t) \right |<\infty \right \} \right. .$$

By the Paley-Wiener theorem, the spherical transforms of smooth SU(2)-invariant functions of compact support are precisely functions on R which are restrictions of holomorphic functions on C satisfying an exponential growth condition

$$|F(\lambda)|\le C e^{ R \left|\operatorname{Im} \lambda\right|}.$$

As a function on G, Φ_{λ} is the matrix coefficient of the spherical principal series defined on L^{2}(C), where C is identified with the boundary of $\mathfrak{H}^3$. The representation is given by the formula

$$\pi_\lambda(g^{-1})\xi(z)=|cz + d|^{-2-i\lambda} \xi(g(z)).$$

The function

$$\xi_0(z)=\pi^{-1} \left (1+|z|^2 \right )^{-2}$$

is fixed by SU(2) and

$$\Phi_\lambda(g)=(\pi_\lambda(g)\xi_0,\xi_0).$$

The representations π_{λ} are irreducible and unitarily equivalent only when the sign of λ is changed. The map W of $L^2(\mathfrak{H}^3)$ onto L^{2}([0,∞) × C) (with measure λ^{2} dλ on the first factor) given by

$$Wf(\lambda,z)= \int_{G/K} f(g) \pi_\lambda(g)\xi_0(z) \, dg$$

is unitary and gives the decomposition of $L^2({\mathfrak H}^3)$ as a direct integral of the spherical principal series.

== Example: SL(2, R) ==
The group G = SL(2,R) acts transitively on the Poincaré upper half plane

$$\mathfrak{H}^2 = \{x+r i \mid r>0\}$$

by Möbius transformations. The real matrix

$$g=\begin{pmatrix} a & b \\ c& d \end{pmatrix}$$

acts as

$$g(w)=(aw+b)(cw +d)^{-1}.$$

The stabiliser of the point i is the maximal compact subgroup K = SO(2), so that $\mathfrak{H}^2$ = G / K. It carries the G-invariant Riemannian metric

$$ds^2 =r^{-2} \left(dx^2 + dr^2\right)$$

with associated area element

$$dA= r^{-2}\, dx\,dr$$

and Laplacian operator

$$\Delta = -r^2(\partial_x^2 + \partial_r^2).$$

Every point in $\mathfrak{H}^2$ can be written as k( e^{t} i ) with k in SO(2) and t determined up to a sign. The Laplacian has the following form on functions invariant under SO(2), regarded as functions of the real parameter t:
$$\Delta= - \partial_t^2 - \coth t \partial_t.$$

The integral of an SO(2)-invariant function is given by
$$\int f \, dA= \int_{-\infty}^{\infty} f(t) \left|\sinh t\right| dt.$$

There are several methods for deriving the corresponding eigenfunction expansion for this ordinary differential equation including:

1. the classical spectral theory of ordinary differential equations applied to the hypergeometric equation (Mehler, Weyl, Fock);
2. variants of Hadamard's method of descent, realising 2-dimensional hyperbolic space as the quotient of 3-dimensional hyperbolic space by the free action of a 1-parameter subgroup of SL(2,C);
3. Abel's integral equation, following Selberg and Godement;
4. orbital integrals (Harish-Chandra, Gelfand & Naimark).

The second and third technique will be described below, with two different methods of descent: the classical one due Hadamard, familiar from treatments of the heat equation and the wave equation on hyperbolic space; and Flensted-Jensen's method on the hyperboloid.

=== Hadamard's method of descent ===
If f(x,r) is a function on $\mathfrak{H}^2$ and

$$M_1f(x,y,r)=r^{1/2}\cdot f(x,r)$$

then

$$\Delta_3 M_1 f= M_1 \left (\Delta_2 + \tfrac{3}{4} \right )f,$$

where Δ_{n} is the Laplacian on ${\mathfrak H}^n$.

Since the action of SL(2,C) commutes with Δ_{3}, the operator M_{0} on S0(2)-invariant functions obtained by averaging M_{1}f by the action of SU(2) also satisfies

$$\Delta_3 M_0= M_0 \left (\Delta_2 + \tfrac{3}{4} \right).$$

The adjoint operator M_{1}* defined by

$$M_1^* F(x,r)=r^{1/2} \int_{-\infty}^\infty F(x,y,r)\, dy$$

satisfies

$$\int_{\mathfrak{H}^3} (M_1f)\cdot F \,dV = \int_{\mathfrak{H}^2} f\cdot (M_1^*F) \,dA.$$

The adjoint M_{0}*, defined by averaging M*f over SO(2), satisfies
$$\int_{\mathfrak{H}^3} (M_0f)\cdot F \,dV = \int_{\mathfrak{H}^2} f\cdot (M_0^*F) \,dA$$
for SU(2)-invariant functions F and SO(2)-invariant functions f. It follows that
$$M_i^* \Delta_3= \left (\Delta_2 + \tfrac{3}{4} \right )M_i^*.$$

The function
$$f_\lambda= M_1^* \Phi_\lambda$$
is SO(2)-invariant and satisfies
$$\Delta_2 f_\lambda= \left (\lambda^2 + \tfrac{1}{4} \right )f_\lambda.$$

On the other hand,
$$b(\lambda)=f_\lambda(i)=\int {\sin \lambda t \over \lambda \sinh t} \, dt= {\pi\over \lambda} \tanh{\pi\lambda\over 2},$$

since the integral can be computed by integrating $e^{i\lambda t} /\sinh t$ around the rectangular indented contour with vertices at ±R and ±R + πi. Thus the eigenfunction

$$\phi_\lambda=b(\lambda)^{-1} M_1\Phi_\lambda$$

satisfies the normalisation condition φ_{λ}(i) = 1. There can only be one such solution either because the Wronskian of the ordinary differential equation must vanish or by expanding as a power series in sinh r. It follows that

$$\varphi_\lambda(e^t i) = \frac{1}{2\pi} \int_0^{2\pi} \left(\cosh t - \sinh t \cos \theta\right)^{-1-i\lambda} \, d\theta.$$

Similarly it follows that

$$\Phi_\lambda = M_1 \phi_\lambda.$$

If the spherical transform of an SO(2)-invariant function on $\mathfrak{H}^2$ is defined by

$$\tilde{f}(\lambda)=\int f \varphi_{-\lambda} \,dA,$$

then

$${(M_1^* F)}^\sim(\lambda) = \tilde{F}(\lambda).$$

Taking f=M_{1}*F, the SL(2, C) inversion formula for F immediately yields

$$f(x)=\int_{-\infty}^\infty \varphi_\lambda(x) \tilde{f}(\lambda) {\lambda \pi\over 2} \tanh \left ({\pi\lambda\over 2} \right ) \, d\lambda,$$

the spherical inversion formula for SO(2)-invariant functions on $\mathfrak{H}^2$.

As for SL(2,C), this immediately implies the Plancherel formula for f_{i} in C_{c}(SL(2,R) / SO(2)):

$$\int_{\mathfrak{H}^2} f_1\overline{f_2} \,dA = \int_{-\infty}^\infty \tilde{f}_1 \overline{\tilde{f_2}} {\lambda \pi\over 2} \tanh \left ({\pi\lambda\over 2} \right )\, d\lambda.$$

The spherical function φ_{λ} is an eigenfunction of the Laplacian:

$$\Delta_2 \varphi_\lambda= \left (\lambda^2 + \tfrac{1}{4} \right ) \varphi_\lambda.$$

Schwartz functions on R are the spherical transforms of functions f belonging to the Harish-Chandra Schwartz space

$${\mathcal S} = \left \{f \left | \sup_t \left |(1+t^2)^N(I+\Delta)^M f(t)\varphi_0(t) \right |<\infty \right \} \right. .$$

The spherical transforms of smooth SO(2)-invariant functions of compact support are precisely functions on R which are restrictions of holomorphic functions on C satisfying an exponential growth condition

$$|F(\lambda)|\le C e^{R|\Im\lambda|}.$$

Both these results can be deduced by descent from the corresponding results for SL(2,C), by verifying directly that the spherical transform satisfies the given growth conditions and then using the relation $(M_1^* F)^\sim = \tilde{F}$.

As a function on G, φ_{λ} is the matrix coefficient of the spherical principal series defined on L^{2}(R), where R is identified with the boundary of $\mathfrak{H}^2$. The representation is given by the formula

$$\pi_\lambda(g^{-1})\xi(x)=|cx + d|^{-1-i\lambda} \xi(g(x)).$$

The function

$$\xi_0(x) = \pi^{-1} \left(1+|x|^2\right)^{-1}$$

is fixed by SO(2) and

$$\Phi_\lambda(g)=(\pi_\lambda(g)\xi_0,\xi_0).$$

The representations π_{λ} are irreducible and unitarily equivalent only when the sign of λ is changed. The map $W: L^2({\mathfrak H}^2) \to L^2 ([0,\infty) \times \R)$ with measure $\frac{\lambda\pi}{2} \tanh \left( \frac{\pi\lambda}{2} \right )\, d\lambda$ on the first factor, is given by the formula

$$Wf(\lambda,x)= \int_{G/K} f(g) \pi_\lambda(g)\xi_0(x) \, dg$$

is unitary and gives the decomposition of $L^2(\mathfrak{H}^2)$ as a direct integral of the spherical principal series.

=== Flensted–Jensen's method of descent ===
Hadamard's method of descent relied on functions invariant under the action of 1-parameter subgroup of translations in the y parameter in $\mathfrak{H}^3$. Flensted–Jensen's method uses the centraliser of SO(2) in SL(2,C) which splits as a direct product of SO(2) and the 1-parameter subgroup K_{1} of matrices

$$g_t=\begin{pmatrix} \cosh t & i\sinh t \\ -i\sinh t& \cosh t\end{pmatrix}.$$

The symmetric space SL(2,C)/SU(2) can be identified with the space H^{3} of positive 2×2 matrices A with determinant 1
$$A=\begin{pmatrix} a+b & x+iy \\ x-iy & a -b\end{pmatrix}$$
with the group action given by
$$g\cdot A = gAg^*.$$

Thus
$$g_t\cdot A=\begin{pmatrix} a \cosh 2t +y \sinh 2t +b & x+i(y\cosh 2t + a\sinh 2t) \\ x-i(y\cosh 2t + a\sinh 2t) & a\cosh 2t +y \sinh 2t -b\end{pmatrix}.$$

So on the hyperboloid $a^2=1+b^2 +x^2 +y^2$, g_{t} only changes the coordinates y and a. Similarly the action of SO(2) acts by rotation on the coordinates (b,x) leaving a and y unchanged. The space H^{2} of real-valued positive matrices A with y = 0 can be identified with the orbit of the identity matrix under SL(2,R). Taking coordinates (b,x,y) in H^{3} and (b,x) on H^{2} the volume and area elements are given by

$$dV =(1+r^2)^{-1/2} \,db\, dx\, dy,\,\,\, dA= (1+r^2)^{-1/2} \,db\, dx,$$

where r^{2} equals b^{2} + x^{2} + y^{2} or b^{2} + x^{2}, so that r is related to hyperbolic distance from the origin by $r =\sinh t$.

The Laplacian operators are given by the formula

$$\Delta_n=-L_n - R_n^2 -(n-1)R_n, \,$$

where

$$L_2=\partial_b^2 +\partial_x^2, \,\,\, R_2=b\partial_b + x\partial_x$$

and

$$L_3=\partial_b^2 +\partial_x^2 +\partial_y^2,\,\, \, R_3=b\partial_b + x\partial_x + y\partial_y. \,$$

For an SU(2)-invariant function F on H^{3} and an SO(2)-invariant function on H^{2}, regarded as functions of r or t,

$$\int_{H^3} F \,dV =4\pi \int_{-\infty}^\infty F(t) \sinh^2 t \, dt,\,\,\, \int_{H^2} f \,dV =2\pi\int_{-\infty}^\infty f(t) \sinh t \, dt.$$

If f(b,x) is a function on H^{2}, Ef is defined by

$$Ef(b,x,y)=f(b,x). \,$$

Thus

$$\Delta_3 Ef = E(\Delta_2 - R_2)f. \,$$

If f is SO(2)-invariant, then, regarding f as a function of r or t,

$$(-\Delta_2 +R_2)f= \partial_t^2 f + \coth t \partial _t f + r\partial_r f =\partial_t^2 f + (\coth t + \tanh t)\partial_t f.$$

On the other hand,
$$\partial_t^2 + (\coth t + \tanh t)\partial_t =\partial_t^2 + 2 \coth(2t) \partial_t.$$

Thus, setting Sf(t) = f(2t),
$$(\Delta_2 -R_2)Sf = 4S\Delta_2f,$$
leading to the fundamental descent relation of Flensted-Jensen for M_{0} = ES:
$$\Delta_3 M_0 f = 4M_0\Delta_2 f.$$

The same relation holds with M_{0} by M, where Mf is obtained by averaging M_{0}f over SU(2).

The extension Ef is constant in the y variable and therefore invariant under the transformations g_{s}. On the other hand, for F a suitable function on H^{3}, the function QF defined by
$$QF = \int_{K_1}F\circ g_s \, ds$$
is independent of the y variable. A straightforward change of variables shows that
$$\int_{H^3}F \, dV = \int_{H^2} (1+b^2 +x^2)^{1/2} QF \, dA.$$

Since K_{1} commutes with SO(2), QF is SO(2)--invariant if F is, in particular if F is SU(2)-invariant. In this case QF is a function of r or t, so that M*F can be defined by
$$M^*F(t)=QF(t/2).$$

The integral formula above then yields
$$\int_{H^3} F \, dV = \int_{H^2} M^*F \, dA$$
and hence, since for f SO(2)-invariant,
$$M^*((Mf)\cdot F) =f \cdot (M^*F),$$
the following adjoint formula:
$$\int_{H^3} (Mf)\cdot F \, dV =\int_{H^2} f\cdot (M*F)\, dV.$$

As a consequence
$$M^*\Delta_3 = 4\Delta_2M^*.$$

Thus, as in the case of Hadamard's method of descent.

$$M^*\Phi_{2\lambda} =b(\lambda) \varphi_\lambda$$
with
$$b(\lambda)=M^*\Phi_{2\lambda}(0)=\pi \tanh \pi \lambda$$
and
$$\Phi_{2\lambda}=M\varphi_\lambda.$$

It follows that
$${(M^* F)}^\sim(\lambda) = \tilde{F}(2\lambda).$$

Taking f=M*F, the SL(2,C) inversion formula for F then immediately yields
$$f(x)=\int_{-\infty}^\infty \varphi_\lambda(x) \tilde{f}(\lambda)\,{\lambda \pi\over 2} \tanh\left(\frac{\pi\lambda}{2}\right)\, d\lambda,$$

=== Abel's integral equation ===
The spherical function φ_{λ} is given by
$$\varphi_\lambda(g)=\int_K \alpha'(kg) \, dk,$$
so that
$$\tilde{f}(\lambda)=\int_S f(s) \alpha'(s)\, ds,$$

Thus
$$\tilde{f}(\lambda)=\int_{-\infty}^\infty \int_0^\infty f\!\left(\frac{a^2 + a^{-2} +b^2}{2}\right)a^{-i\lambda/2} \, da\,db,$$

so that defining F by

$$F(u)=\int_{-\infty}^\infty f\!\left(u + \frac{t^2}{2}\right) \, dt,$$

the spherical transform can be written

$$\tilde{f}(\lambda)=\int_0^\infty F\!\left(\frac{a^2+a^{-2}}{2}\right) a^{-i\lambda}\, da= \int_0^\infty F(\cosh t)e^{-it\lambda} \, dt.$$

The relation between F and f is classically inverted by the Abel integral equation:

$$f(x)= \frac{-1}{2\pi} \int_{-\infty}^\infty F'\!\left(x +{t^2\over 2}\right)\, dt.$$

In fact

$$\int_{-\infty}^\infty F'\!\left(x + \frac{t^2}{2}\right)\, dt
= \int_{-\infty}^\infty \int_{-\infty}^\infty f'\!\left(x + \frac{t^2 + u^2}{2}\right) \, dt\,du
={2\pi} \int_0^\infty f'\!\left(x + \frac{r^2}{2}\right) r\, dr
= -2\pi f(x).$$

The relation between F and $\tilde{f}$ is inverted by the Fourier inversion formula:

$$F(\cosh t)={2\over \pi} \int_0^\infty\tilde{f}(i\lambda)\cos(\lambda t) \, d\lambda.$$

Hence

$$f(i)={1\over 2\pi^2} \int_0^\infty \tilde{f}(\lambda) \lambda\, d\lambda \int_{-\infty}^\infty {\sin \lambda t/2\over \sinh t} \cosh {t\over 2} \, dt ={1\over 2\pi^2} \int_{-\infty}^\infty \tilde{f}(\lambda) {\lambda\pi\over 2} \tanh\left({\pi\lambda\over 2}\right)\, d\lambda.$$

This gives the spherical inversion for the point i. Now for fixed g in SL(2,R) define

$$f_1(w)=\int_K f(gkw) \, dk,$$

another rotation invariant function on $\mathfrak{H}^2$ with f_{1}(i)=f(g(i)). On the other hand, for biinvariant functions f,

$$\pi_\lambda(f)\xi_0 =\tilde{f}(\lambda) \xi_0$$

so that

$$\tilde{f}_1(\lambda)=\tilde{f}(\lambda)\cdot \varphi_\lambda(w),$$

where w = g(i). Combining this with the above inversion formula for f_{1} yields the general spherical inversion formula:

$$f(w) ={1\over \pi^2} \int_0^\infty \tilde{f}(\lambda) \varphi_\lambda(w) {\lambda\pi\over 2} \tanh\left({\pi\lambda\over 2}\right)\, d\lambda.$$

== Other special cases ==
All complex semisimple Lie groups or the Lorentz groups SO^{0}(N,1) with N odd can be treated directly by reduction to the usual Fourier transform. The remaining real Lorentz groups can be deduced by Flensted-Jensen's method of descent, as can other semisimple Lie groups of real rank one. Flensted-Jensen's method of descent also applies to the treatment of real semisimple Lie groups for which the Lie algebras are normal real forms of complex semisimple Lie algebras. The special case of SL(N,R) is treated in detail in Jorgenson & Lang (2001); this group is also the normal real form of SL(N,C).

The approach of Flensted-Jensen (1978) applies to a wide class of real semisimple Lie groups of arbitrary real rank and yields the explicit product form of the Plancherel measure on $\mathfrak{a}$* without using Harish-Chandra's expansion of the spherical functions φ_{λ} in terms of his c-function, discussed below. Although less general, it gives a simpler approach to the Plancherel theorem for this class of groups.

=== Complex semisimple Lie groups ===
If G is a complex semisimple Lie group, it is the complexification of its maximal compact subgroup U, a compact semisimple Lie group. If $\mathfrak{g}$ and $\mathfrak{u}$ are their Lie algebras, then $\mathfrak{g} = \mathfrak{u} \oplus i\mathfrak{u}.$ Let T be a maximal torus in U with Lie algebra $\mathfrak{t}.$ Then setting

$$A= \exp i \mathfrak{t}, \qquad P= \exp i \mathfrak{u},$$

there is the Cartan decomposition:

$$G=P\cdot U = UAU.$$

The finite-dimensional irreducible representations π_{λ} of U are indexed by certain λ in $\mathfrak{t}^*$. The corresponding character formula and dimension formula of Hermann Weyl give explicit formulas for

$$\chi_\lambda(e^X) = \operatorname{Tr} \pi_\lambda(e^X), (X\in \mathfrak{t}), \qquad d(\lambda)=\dim \pi_\lambda.$$

These formulas, initially defined on $\mathfrak{t}^*\times \mathfrak{t}$ and $\mathfrak{t}^*$, extend holomorphic to their complexifications. Moreover,

$$\chi_\lambda(e^X)={\sum_{\sigma \in W} {\rm sign}(\sigma) e^{i\lambda(\sigma X)}\over \delta(e^X)},$$

where W is the Weyl group $W =N_U(T)/T$ and δ(e^{X}) is given by a product formula (Weyl's denominator formula) which extends holomorphically to the complexification of $\mathfrak{t}$. There is a similar product formula for d(λ), a polynomial in λ.

On the complex group G, the integral of a U-biinvariant function F can be evaluated as

$$\int_G F(g) \, dg = {1\over |W|} \int_{\mathfrak{a}} F(e^X)\, |\delta(e^X)|^2 \, dX.$$

where $\mathfrak{a}=i\mathfrak{t}$.

The spherical functions of G are labelled by λ in $\mathfrak{a}=i\mathfrak{t}^*$ and given by the Harish-Chandra-Berezin formula

$$\Phi_\lambda(e^X) = {\chi_\lambda(e^X)\over d(\lambda)}.$$

They are the matrix coefficients of the irreducible spherical principal series of G induced from the character of the Borel subgroup of G corresponding to λ; these representations are irreducible and can all be realized on L^{2}(U/T).

The spherical transform of a U-biinvariant function F is given by

$$\tilde{F}(\lambda)=\int_G F(g) \Phi_{-\lambda}(g)\, dg$$

and the spherical inversion formula by

$$F(g) ={1\over |W|}\int_{{\mathfrak a}^*} \tilde{F}(\lambda)\Phi_\lambda(g) |d(\lambda)|^2 \, d\,\lambda=
\int_{{\mathfrak a}^*_+} \tilde{F}(\lambda)\Phi_\lambda(g) |d(\lambda)|^2 \, d\,\lambda,$$

where ${\mathfrak a}^*_+$ is a Weyl chamber. In fact the result follows from the Fourier inversion formula on $\mathfrak{a}$ since
$$d(\lambda)\delta(e^X)\Phi_\lambda(e^X)=\sum_{\sigma\in W} {\rm sign}(\sigma) e^{i\lambda(X)},$$
so that $\overline{d(\lambda)}\tilde{F}(\lambda)$ is just the Fourier transform of $F(e^X)\delta(e^X)$.

Note that the symmetric space G/U has as compact dual the compact symmetric space U x U / U, where U is the diagonal subgroup. The spherical functions for the latter space, which can be identified with U itself, are the normalized characters χ_{λ}/d(λ) indexed by lattice points in the interior of $\mathfrak {a}^*_+$ and the role of A is played by T. The spherical transform of f of a class function on U is given by

$$\tilde{f}(\lambda)=\int_U f(u){\overline{\chi_\lambda(u)}\over d(\lambda)} \,du$$

and the spherical inversion formula now follows from the theory of Fourier series on T:

$$f(u)=\sum_{\lambda} \tilde{f}(\lambda) {\chi_\lambda(u)\over d(\lambda)} d(\lambda)^2.$$

There is an evident duality between these formulas and those for the non-compact dual.

=== Real semisimple Lie groups ===
Let G_{0} be a normal real form of the complex semisimple Lie group G, the fixed points of an involution σ, conjugate linear on the Lie algebra of G. Let τ be a Cartan involution of G_{0} extended to an involution of G, complex linear on its Lie algebra, chosen to commute with σ. The fixed point subgroup of τσ is a compact real form U of G, intersecting G_{0} in a maximal compact subgroup K_{0}. The fixed point subgroup of τ is K, the complexification of K_{0}. Let G_{0}= K_{0}·P_{0} be the corresponding Cartan decomposition of G_{0} and let A be a maximal Abelian subgroup of P_{0}. Flensted-Jensen (1978) proved that
$$G = K A_+ U,$$
where A_{+} is the image of the closure of a Weyl chamber in $\mathfrak{a}$ under the exponential map. Moreover,
$$K\backslash G/U = A_+.$$

Since
$$K_0\backslash G_0/K_0 = A_+$$

it follows that there is a canonical identification between K \ G / U, K_{0} \ G_{0} /K_{0} and A_{+}. Thus K_{0}-biinvariant functions on G_{0} can be identified with functions on A_{+} as can functions on G that are left invariant under K and right invariant under U. Let f be a function in $C^\infty_c(K_0\backslash G_0 /K_0)$ and define Mf in $C^\infty_c(U\backslash G /U)$ by
$$Mf(a)=\int_U f(ua^2) \,du.$$

Here a third Cartan decomposition of G = UAU has been used to identify U \ G / U with A_{+}.

Let Δ be the Laplacian on G_{0}/K_{0} and let Δ_{c} be the Laplacian on G/U. Then
$$4M\Delta = \Delta_c M.$$

For F in $C^\infty_c(U\backslash G /U)$, define M*F in $C^\infty_c(K_0\backslash G_0 /K_0)$ by
$$M^*F(a^2)=\int_K F(ga) \, dg.$$

Then M and M* satisfy the duality relations
$$\int_{G/U} (Mf) \cdot F = \int_{G_0/K_0} f\cdot (M^*F).$$

In particular
$$M^*\Delta_c= 4\Delta M^*.$$

There is a similar compatibility for other operators in the center of the universal enveloping algebra of G_{0}. It follows from the eigenfunction characterisation of spherical functions that $M^*\Phi_{2\lambda}$ is proportional to φ_{λ} on G_{0}, the constant of proportionality being given by
$$b(\lambda)=M^*\Phi_{2\lambda}(1)=\int_K \Phi_{2\lambda}(k)\, dk.$$

Moreover, in this case
$$(M^* F)^\sim(\lambda)= \tilde{F}(2\lambda).$$

If f = M*F, then the spherical inversion formula for F on G implies that for f on G_{0}:
$$f(g)= \int_{\mathfrak{a}^*_+} \tilde{f}(\lambda) \varphi_\lambda(g) \,\, 2^{{\rm dim}\, A}\cdot |b(\lambda)|\cdot |d(2\lambda)|^2 \,d\lambda,$$
since
$$f(g)= M^*F(g)= \int_{\mathfrak{a}_+^*} \tilde{F}(2\lambda) M^*\Phi_{2\lambda}(g) 2^{{\rm dim}\, A} |d(2\lambda)|^2 \, d\lambda
= \int_{\mathfrak{a}_+^*} \tilde{f}(\lambda) \varphi_\lambda(g) \,\,b(\lambda) 2^{{\rm dim}\, A} |d(2\lambda)|^2 \, d\lambda.$$

The direct calculation of the integral for b(λ), generalising the computation of Godement (1957) for SL(2,R), was left as an open problem by Flensted-Jensen (1978). An explicit product formula for b(λ) was known from the prior determination of the Plancherel measure by Harish-Chandra (1966), giving
$$b(\lambda) =C\cdot d(2\lambda)^{-1}\cdot \prod_{\alpha>0} \tanh {\pi(\alpha,\lambda)\over (\alpha,\alpha)},$$

where α ranges over the positive roots of the root system in $\mathfrak{a}$ and C is a normalising constant, given as a quotient of products of Gamma functions.

== Harish-Chandra's Plancherel theorem ==
Let G be a noncompact connected real semisimple Lie group with finite center. Let $\mathfrak{g}$ denote its Lie algebra. Let K be a maximal compact subgroup given as the subgroup of fixed points of a Cartan involution σ. Let $\mathfrak{g}_{\pm}$ be the ±1 eigenspaces of σ in $\mathfrak{g}$, so that $\mathfrak{k}=\mathfrak{g}_+$ is the Lie algebra of K and $\mathfrak{p}=\mathfrak{g}_-$ give the Cartan decomposition

$$\mathfrak{g}=\mathfrak{k}+\mathfrak{p},\,\, G=\exp \mathfrak{p}\cdot K.$$

Let $\mathfrak {a}$ be a maximal Abelian subalgebra of $\mathfrak{p}$ and for α in $\mathfrak {a}^*$ let

$$\mathfrak{g}_\alpha=\{X\in \mathfrak{g}: [H,X]=\alpha(H)X\,\,(H\in \mathfrak{a})\}.$$

If α ≠ 0 and $\mathfrak{g}_\alpha\ne (0)$, then α is called a restricted root and $m_\alpha = \dim \mathfrak{g}_\alpha$ is called its multiplicity. Let A = exp $\mathfrak {a}$, so that G = KAK.The restriction of the Killing form defines an inner product on $\mathfrak{p}$ and hence $\mathfrak{a}$, which allows $\mathfrak{a}^*$ to be identified with $\mathfrak{a}$. With respect to this inner product, the restricted roots Σ give a root system. Its Weyl group can be identified with $W = N_K(A) / C_K(A)$. A choice of positive roots defines a Weyl chamber $\mathfrak{a}_+^*$. The reduced root system Σ_{0} consists of roots α such that α/2 is not a root.

Defining the spherical functions φ_{λ} as above for λ in $\mathfrak {a}^*$, the spherical transform of f in C_{c}^{∞}(K \ G / K) is defined by
$$\tilde{f}(\lambda)=\int_G f(g) \varphi_{-\lambda}(g)\, dg.$$

The spherical inversion formula states that
$$f(g)=\int_{\mathfrak{a}^*_+} \tilde{f}(\lambda) \varphi_\lambda(g)\, |c(\lambda)|^{-2}\, d\lambda,$$
where Harish-Chandra's c-function c(λ) is defined by
$$c(\lambda)=c_0\cdot\prod_{\alpha\in \Sigma_0^+} \frac{2^{-i(\lambda,\alpha_0)}
\Gamma(i(\lambda,\alpha_0))}{
\Gamma\!\left(\frac{1}{2}\left[\frac{1}{2} m_\alpha + 1 +i(\lambda,\alpha_0)\right]\right)
\Gamma\!\left(\frac{1}{2}\left[\frac{1}{2} m_{\alpha} + m_{2\alpha} +i(\lambda,\alpha_0)\right]\right)}$$
with $\alpha_0=(\alpha,\alpha)^{-1} \alpha$ and the constant c_{0} chosen so that c(−iρ) = 1 where
$$\rho = \frac{1}{2} \sum_{\alpha\in \Sigma^+} m_\alpha \alpha.$$

The Plancherel theorem for spherical functions states that the map
$$W:f\mapsto \tilde{f},\,\,\,\ L^2(K\backslash G /K) \rightarrow L^2(\mathfrak{a}_+^*, |c(\lambda)|^{-2}\, d\lambda)$$
is unitary and transforms convolution by $f\in L^1(K\backslash G/K)$ into multiplication by $\tilde{f}$.

== Harish-Chandra's spherical function expansion ==
Since G = KAK, functions on G/K that are invariant under K can be identified with functions on A, and hence $\mathfrak a$, that are invariant under the Weyl group W. In particular since the Laplacian Δ on G/K commutes with the action of G, it defines a second order differential operator L on $\mathfrak a$, invariant under W, called the radial part of the Laplacian. In general if X is in $\mathfrak{a}$, it defines a first order differential operator (or vector field) by
$$Xf(y)=\left.\frac{d}{dt} f(y + tX)\right|_{t=0}.$$

L can be expressed in terms of these operators by the formula
$$L = \Delta_{\mathfrak{a}} - \sum_{\alpha>0} m_\alpha \, \coth \alpha \, A_\alpha,$$
where A_{α} in $\mathfrak{a}$ is defined by
$$(A_\alpha,X)=\alpha(X)$$
and
$$\Delta_{\mathfrak{a}} = -\sum X_i^2$$
is the Laplacian on $\mathfrak{a}$, corresponding to any choice of orthonormal basis (X_{i}).

Thus
$$L=L_0 -\sum_{\alpha>0} m_\alpha\, (\coth \alpha -1) A_\alpha,$$
where
$$L_0=\Delta_{\mathfrak{a}} - \sum_{\alpha>0} A_\alpha,$$
so that L can be regarded as a perturbation of the constant-coefficient operator L_{0}.

Now the spherical function φ_{λ} is an eigenfunction of the Laplacian:
$$\Delta\varphi_\lambda=\left(\left\|\lambda\right\|^2 + \left\|\rho\right\|^2\right)\varphi_\lambda$$
and therefore of L, when viewed as a W-invariant function on $\mathfrak{a}$.

Since e^{iλ–ρ} and its transforms under W are eigenfunctions of L_{0} with the same eigenvalue, it is natural look for a formula for φ_{λ} in terms of a perturbation series
$$f_\lambda=e^{i\lambda -\rho}\sum_{\mu\in \Lambda} a_\mu(\lambda) e^{-\mu},$$
with Λ the cone of all non-negative integer combinations of positive roots, and the transforms of f_{λ} under W. The expansion
$$\coth x-1 =2 \sum_{m>0} e^{-2mx},$$

leads to a recursive formula for the coefficients a_{μ}(λ). In particular they are uniquely determined and the series and its derivatives converges absolutely on $\mathfrak{a}_+$, a fundamental domain for W. Remarkably it turns out that f_{λ} is also an eigenfunction of the other G-invariant differential operators on G/K, each of which induces a W-invariant differential operator on $\mathfrak{a}$.

It follows that φ_{λ} can be expressed in terms as a linear combination of f_{λ} and its transforms under W:
$$\varphi_\lambda=\sum_{s\in W} c(s\lambda) f_{s\lambda}.$$

Here c(λ) is Harish-Chandra's c-function. It describes the asymptotic behaviour of φ_{λ} in $\mathfrak{a}_+$, since
$$\varphi_\lambda(e^tX) \sim c(\lambda) e^{(i\lambda -\rho)Xt}$$
for X in $\mathfrak{a}_+$ and t > 0 large.

Harish-Chandra obtained a second integral formula for φ_{λ} and hence c(λ) using the Bruhat decomposition of G:
$$G = \bigcup_{s\in W} B s B,$$

where B = MAN and the union is disjoint. Taking the Coxeter element s_{0} of W, the unique element mapping $\mathfrak{a}_+$ onto $-\mathfrak{a}_+$, it follows that σ(N) has a dense open orbit G/B = K/M whose complement is a union of cells of strictly smaller dimension and therefore has measure zero. It follows that the integral formula for φ_{λ} initially defined over K/M

$$\varphi_\lambda(g) = \int_{K/M} \lambda'(gk)^{-1}\, dk.$$

can be transferred to σ(N):
$$\varphi_\lambda(e^X) = e^{i\lambda -\rho} \int_{\sigma(N)} {\overline{\lambda'(n)} \over \lambda'(e^Xne^{-X})} \, dn,$$
for X in $\mathfrak{a}$.

Since
$$\lim_{t\to \infty} e^{tX} n e^{-tX} = 1$$

for X in $\mathfrak{a}_+$, the asymptotic behaviour of φ_{λ} can be read off from this integral, leading to the formula:
$$c(\lambda)=\int_{\sigma(N)} \overline{\lambda'(n)}\, dn.$$

== Harish-Chandra's c-function ==
The many roles of Harish-Chandra's c-function in non-commutative harmonic analysis are surveyed in Helgason (2000). Although it was originally introduced by Harish-Chandra in the asymptotic expansions of spherical functions, discussed above, it was also soon understood to be intimately related to intertwining operators between induced representations, first studied in this context by Bruhat (1956). These operators exhibit the unitary equivalence between π_{λ} and π_{sλ} for s in the Weyl group and a c-function c_{s}(λ) can be attached to each such operator: namely the value at 1 of the intertwining operator applied to ξ_{0}, the constant function 1, in L^{2}(K/M). Equivalently, since ξ_{0} is up to scalar multiplication the unique vector fixed by K, it is an eigenvector of the intertwining operator with eigenvalue c_{s}(λ). These operators all act on the same space L^{2}(K/M), which can be identified with the representation induced from the 1-dimensional representation defined by λ on MAN. Once A has been chosen, the compact subgroup M is uniquely determined as the centraliser of A in K. The nilpotent subgroup N, however, depends on a choice of a Weyl chamber in $\mathfrak{a}^*$, the various choices being permuted by the Weyl group W = M ' / M, where M ' is the normaliser of A in K. The standard intertwining operator corresponding to (s, λ) is defined on the induced representation by
$$A(s,\lambda)F(k)=\int_{\sigma(N)\cap s^{-1}Ns} F(ksn)\, dn,$$
where σ is the Cartan involution. It satisfies the intertwining relation
$$A(s,\lambda)\pi_\lambda(g) =\pi_{s\lambda}(g) A(s,\lambda).$$

The key property of the intertwining operators and their integrals is the multiplicative cocycle property
$$A(s_1s_2,\lambda) = A(s_1,s_2\lambda) A(s_2,\lambda),$$
whenever
$$\ell(s_1s_2) = \ell(s_1) + \ell(s_2)$$

for the length function on the Weyl group associated with the choice of Weyl chamber. For s in W, this is the number of chambers crossed by the straight line segment between X and sX for any point X in the interior of the chamber. The unique element of greatest length s_{0}, namely the number of positive restricted roots, is the unique element that carries the Weyl chamber $\mathfrak{a}_+^*$ onto $-\mathfrak{a}_+^*$. By Harish-Chandra's integral formula, it corresponds to Harish-Chandra's c-function:

$$c(\lambda)=c_{s_0}(\lambda).$$

The c-functions are in general defined by the equation
$$A(s,\lambda)\xi_0 =c_s(\lambda)\xi_0,$$
where ξ_{0} is the constant function 1 in L^{2}(K/M). The cocycle property of the intertwining operators implies a similar multiplicative property for the c-functions:
$$c_{s_1s_2}(\lambda) =c_{s_1}(s_2 \lambda)c_{s_2}(\lambda)$$
provided
$$\ell(s_1 s_2) = \ell(s_1) + \ell(s_2).$$

This reduces the computation of c_{s} to the case when s = s_{α}, the reflection in a (simple) root α, the so-called "rank-one reduction" of Gindikin & Karpelevich (1962). In fact the integral involves only the closed connected subgroup G^{α} corresponding to the Lie subalgebra generated by $\mathfrak{g}_{\pm \alpha}$ where α lies in Σ_{0}^{+}. Then G^{α} is a real semisimple Lie group with real rank one, i.e. dim A^{α} = 1, and c_{s} is just the Harish-Chandra c-function of G^{α}. In this case the c-function can be computed directly by various means:

- by noting that φ_{λ} can be expressed in terms of the hypergeometric function for which the asymptotic expansion is known from the classical formulas of Gauss for the connection coefficients;
- by directly computing the integral, which can be expressed as an integral in two variables and hence a product of two beta functions.

This yields the following formula:
$$c_{s_\alpha}(\lambda) = c_0 \frac{2^{-i(\lambda,\alpha_0)}\Gamma(i(\lambda,\alpha_0))}{\Gamma\!\left(\frac{1}{2} \left( \frac{1}{2} m_\alpha + 1+ i(\lambda,\alpha_0)\right)\right) \Gamma\!\left(\frac{1}{2} \left(\frac{1}{2}m_\alpha + m_{2\alpha} + i(\lambda,\alpha_0)\right)\right)},$$
where
$$c_0 = 2^{m_\alpha/2 + m_{2\alpha}} \Gamma\!\left(\tfrac{1}{2} (m_\alpha+m_{2\alpha} +1)\right).$$

The general Gindikin–Karpelevich formula for c(λ) is an immediate consequence of this formula and the multiplicative properties of c_{s}(λ).

== Paley–Wiener theorem ==
The Paley-Wiener theorem generalizes the classical Paley-Wiener theorem by characterizing the spherical transforms of smooth K-bivariant functions of compact support on G. It is a necessary and sufficient condition that the spherical transform be W-invariant and that there is an R > 0 such that for each N there is an estimate

$$|\tilde{f}(\lambda)|\le C_N (1+|\lambda|)^{-N} e^{R \left|\operatorname{Im} \lambda\right|}.$$

In this case f is supported in the closed ball of radius R about the origin in G/K.

This was proved by Helgason and Gangolli (Helgason (1970) pg. 37).

The theorem was later proved by Flensted-Jensen (1986) independently of the spherical inversion theorem, using a modification of his method of reduction to the complex case.

== Rosenberg's proof of inversion formula ==
Rosenberg (1977) noticed that the Paley-Wiener theorem and the spherical inversion theorem could be proved simultaneously, by a trick which considerably simplified previous proofs.

The first step of his proof consists in showing directly that the inverse transform, defined using Harish-Chandra's c-function, defines a function supported in the closed ball of radius R about the origin if the Paley-Wiener estimate is satisfied. This follows because the integrand defining the inverse transform extends to a meromorphic function on the complexification of $\mathfrak{a}^*$; the integral can be shifted to $\mathfrak{a}^* + i\mu t$ for μ in $\mathfrak{a}^*_+$ and t > 0. Using Harish-Chandra's expansion of φ_{λ} and the formulas for c(λ) in terms of Gamma functions, the integral can be bounded for t large and hence can be shown to vanish outside the closed ball of radius R about the origin.

This part of the Paley-Wiener theorem shows that
$$T(f)=\int_{\mathfrak{a}_+^*} \tilde{f}(\lambda) |c(\lambda)|^{-2} \, d\lambda$$
defines a distribution on G/K with support at the origin o. A further estimate for the integral shows that it is in fact given by a measure and that therefore there is a constant C such that
$$T(f) = Cf(o).$$

By applying this result to
$$f_1(g)=\int_K f(x^{-1}kg)\, dk,$$
it follows that
$$Cf=\int_{\mathfrak{a}_+^*} \tilde{f}(\lambda) \varphi_\lambda |c(\lambda)|^{-2} \, d\lambda.$$

A further scaling argument allows the inequality C = 1 to be deduced from the Plancherel theorem and Paley-Wiener theorem on $\mathfrak{a}$.

== Schwartz functions ==
The Harish-Chandra Schwartz space can be defined as

$$\mathcal{S}(K\backslash G/K)= \left \{f\in C^\infty(G/K)^K:\sup_{x} \left |(1+d(x,o))^m (\Delta + I)^n f(x) \right |<\infty \right \}.$$

Under the spherical transform it is mapped onto $\mathcal{S}(\mathfrak{a}^*)^W,$ the space of W-invariant Schwartz functions on $\mathfrak{a}^*.$

The original proof of Harish-Chandra was a long argument by induction. Anker (1991) found a short and simple proof, allowing the result to be deduced directly from versions of the Paley-Wiener and spherical inversion formula. He proved that the spherical transform of a Harish-Chandra Schwartz function is a classical Schwartz function. His key observation was then to show that the inverse transform was continuous on the Paley-Wiener space endowed with classical Schwartz space seminorms, using classical estimates.
