= Spherical function =

Spherical function can refer to

- Spherical harmonics
- Zonal spherical function
