= Michel Plancherel =

Swiss mathematician (1885–1967)

- Michel Plancherel at the International Mathematical Congress, Zürich 1932
- Born: 16 January 1885; Bussy, Switzerland
- Died: 4 March 1967 (aged 82); Zürich, Switzerland
- Education: University of Fribourg
- Known for: Plancherel measure Plancherel theorem Plancherel theorem for spherical functions
- Scientific career
- Fields: Mathematics
- Workplaces: ETH Zurich
- Thesis: Sur les congruences (mod. 2m) relatives au nombre des classes des formes quadratiques binaires aux coefficients entiers et à discriminant négatif (1907)
- Doctoral advisor: Mathias Lerch

Michel Plancherel (French pronunciation: [miʃɛl plɑ̃ʃʁɛl]; 16 January 1885 – 4 March 1967) was a Swiss mathematician.

== Biography ==
He was born in Bussy (Canton of Fribourg, Switzerland) and obtained his Diplom in mathematics from the University of Fribourg and then his doctoral degree in 1907 with a thesis written under the supervision of Mathias Lerch. Plancherel was a professor in Fribourg (1911), and from 1920 at ETH Zurich.

He worked in the areas of mathematical analysis, mathematical physics and algebra, and is known for the Plancherel theorem in harmonic analysis. He was an Invited Speaker of the ICM in 1924 at Toronto and in 1928 at Bologna.

He was married to Cécile Tercier, had nine children, and presided at the Mission Catholique Française in Zürich.
