= Complementary series representation =

In mathematics, complementary series representations of a reductive real or p-adic Lie groups are certain irreducible unitary representations that are not tempered and do not appear in the decomposition of the regular representation into irreducible representations.

They are rather mysterious: they do not turn up very often, and seem to exist by accident. They were sometimes overlooked, in fact, in some earlier claims to have classified the irreducible unitary representations of certain groups.

Several conjectures in mathematics, such as the Selberg conjecture, are equivalent to saying that certain representations are not complementary. For examples see the representation theory of SL2(R). Elias M. Stein (1972) constructed some families of them for higher rank groups using analytic continuation, sometimes called the Stein complementary series.
