= Noncommutative harmonic analysis =

Application of Fourier analysis to non-abelian topological groups

In mathematics, noncommutative harmonic analysis is the field in which results from Fourier analysis are extended to topological groups that are not commutative. Since locally compact abelian groups have a well-understood theory, Pontryagin duality, which includes the basic structures of Fourier series and Fourier transforms, the major business of non-commutative harmonic analysis is usually taken to be the extension of the theory to all groups G that are locally compact. The case of compact groups is understood, qualitatively and after the Peter–Weyl theorem from the 1920s, as being generally analogous to that of finite groups and their character theory.

The main task is therefore the case of G that is locally compact, not compact and not commutative. The interesting examples include many Lie groups, and also algebraic groups over p-adic fields. These examples are of interest and frequently applied in mathematical physics, and contemporary number theory, particularly automorphic representations.

What to expect is known as the result of basic work of John von Neumann. He showed that if the von Neumann group algebra of G is of type I, then L^{2}(G) as a unitary representation of G is a direct integral of irreducible representations. It is parametrized therefore by the unitary dual, the set of isomorphism classes of such representations, which is given the hull-kernel topology. The analogue of the Plancherel theorem is abstractly given by identifying a measure on the unitary dual, the Plancherel measure, with respect to which the direct integral is taken. (For Pontryagin duality the Plancherel measure is some Haar measure on the dual group to G, the only issue therefore being its normalization.) For general locally compact groups, or even countable discrete groups, the von Neumann group algebra need not be of type I and the regular representation of G cannot be written in terms of irreducible representations, even though it is unitary and completely reducible. An example where this happens is the infinite symmetric group, where the von Neumann group algebra is the hyperfinite type II_{1} factor. The further theory divides up the Plancherel measure into a discrete and a continuous part. For semisimple groups, and classes of solvable Lie groups, a very detailed theory is available.

== See also ==
- Selberg trace formula
- Langlands program
- Kirillov orbit theory
- Discrete series representation
- Zonal spherical function
