= List of algebras =

This is a list of possibly nonassociative algebras. An algebra is a module, wherein you can also multiply two module elements. (The multiplication in the module is compatible with multiplication-by-scalars from the base ring).

- *-algebra
- Affine Lie algebra
- Akivis algebra
- Algebra for a monad
- Albert algebra
- Alternative algebra
- AW*-algebra
- Azumaya algebra
- Banach algebra
- Birman–Wenzl algebra
- Boolean algebra
- Borcherds algebra
- Brauer algebra
- C*-algebra
- Central simple algebra
- Clifford algebra
- Cluster algebra
- Dendriform algebra
- Differential graded algebra
- Differential graded Lie algebra
- Exterior algebra
- F-algebra
- Filtered algebra
- Flexible algebra
- Freudenthal algebra
- Functional-theoretic algebra
- Factorization algebra
- Genetic algebra
- Geometric algebra
- Gerstenhaber algebra
- Graded algebra
- Griess algebra
- Group algebra
- Group algebra of a locally compact group
- Hall algebra
- Hecke algebra of a locally compact group
- Heyting algebra
- Hopf algebra
- Hurwitz algebra
- Hypercomplex algebra
- Incidence algebra
- Iwahori–Hecke algebra
- Jordan algebra
- Kac–Moody algebra
- Kleene algebra
- Leibniz algebra
- Lie algebra
- Lie superalgebra
- Malcev algebra
- Matrix algebra
- Non-associative algebra
- Octonion algebra
- Pre-Lie algebra
- Poisson algebra
- Process algebra
- Quadratic algebra
- Quadric geometric algebra
- Quaternion algebra
- Rees algebra
- Relation algebra
- Relational algebra
- Rota–Baxter algebra
- Schur algebra
- Semisimple algebra
- Separable algebra
- Shuffle algebra
- Sigma-algebra
- Simple algebra
- Structurable algebra
- Supercommutative algebra
- Symmetric algebra
- Tensor algebra
- Universal enveloping algebra
- Vertex operator algebra
- von Neumann algebra
- Weyl algebra
- Zinbiel algebra

This is a list of fields of algebra.

- Linear algebra
- Homological algebra
- Universal algebra
