= Cellular algebra =

Term in abstract algebra

In abstract algebra, a cellular algebra is a finite-dimensional associative algebra A with a distinguished cellular basis which is particularly well-adapted to studying the representation theory of A.

== History ==
The cellular algebras discussed in this article were introduced in a 1996 paper of Graham and Lehrer. However, the terminology had previously been used by Weisfeiler and Lehman in the Soviet Union in the 1960s, to describe what are also known as coherent algebras.

== Definitions ==
Let $R$ be a fixed commutative ring with unit. In most applications this is a field, but this is not needed for the definitions. Let also $A$ be an $R$-algebra.

=== The concrete definition ===
A cell datum for $A$ is a tuple $(\Lambda,i,M,C)$ consisting of

- A finite partially ordered set $\Lambda$.
- A $R$-linear anti-automorphism $i:A\to A$ with $i^2 = \operatorname{id}_A$.
- For every $\lambda\in\Lambda$ a non-empty finite set $M(\lambda)$ of indices.
- An injective map

$$C: \dot{\bigcup}_{\lambda\in\Lambda} M(\lambda)\times M(\lambda) \to A$$

The images under this map are notated with an upper index $\lambda\in\Lambda$ and two lower indices $\mathfrak{s},\mathfrak{t}\in M(\lambda)$ so that the typical element of the image is written as $C_\mathfrak{st}^\lambda$.

and satisfying the following conditions:

1. The image of $C$ is a $R$-basis of $A$.
2. $i(C_\mathfrak{st}^\lambda)=C_\mathfrak{ts}^\lambda$ for all elements of the basis.
3. For every $\lambda\in\Lambda$, $\mathfrak{s},\mathfrak{t}\in M(\lambda)$ and every $a\in A$ the equation

$$aC_\mathfrak{st}^\lambda \equiv \sum_{\mathfrak{u}\in M(\lambda)} r_a(\mathfrak{u},\mathfrak{s}) C_\mathfrak{ut}^\lambda \mod A(<\lambda)$$

with coefficients $r_a(\mathfrak{u},\mathfrak{s})\in R$ depending only on $a$, $\mathfrak{u}$ and $\mathfrak{s}$ but not on $\mathfrak{t}$. Here $A(<\lambda)$ denotes the $R$-span of all basis elements with upper index strictly smaller than $\lambda$.

This definition was originally given by Graham and Lehrer who invented cellular algebras.

=== The more abstract definition ===
Let $i:A\to A$ be an anti-automorphism of $R$-algebras with $i^2 = \operatorname{id}$ (just called "involution" from now on).

A cell ideal of $A$ with respect to $i$ is a two-sided ideal $J\subseteq A$ that satisfies the following.

1. $i(J)=J$.
2. There is a left ideal $\Delta\subseteq J$ that is free as a $R$-module and an isomorphism

$$\alpha: \Delta\otimes_R i(\Delta) \to J$$

of $A$-$A$-bimodules such that $\alpha$ and $i$ are compatible in the sense that

$$\forall x,y\in\Delta: i(\alpha(x\otimes i(y))) = \alpha(y\otimes i(x))$$

A cell chain for $A$ with respect to $i$ is defined as a direct decomposition

$$A=\bigoplus_{k=1}^m U_k$$

into free $R$-submodules such that

1. $i(U_k)=U_k$
2. $J_k:=\bigoplus_{j=1}^k U_j$ is a two-sided ideal of $A$
3. $J_k/J_{k-1}$ is a cell ideal of $A/J_{k-1}$ w.r.t. the induced involution.

Now $(A,i)$ is called a cellular algebra if it has a cell chain. One can show that the two definitions are equivalent. Every basis gives rise to cell chains (one for each topological ordering of $\Lambda$) and choosing a basis of every left ideal $\Delta/J_{k-1}\subseteq J_k/J_{k-1}$ one can construct a corresponding cell basis for $A$.

== Examples ==
=== Polynomial examples ===
$R[x]/(x^n)$ is cellular. A cell datum is given by $i = \operatorname{id}$ and

- $\Lambda := \lbrace 0,\ldots,n-1\rbrace$ with the reverse of the natural ordering.
- $M(\lambda) := \lbrace 1\rbrace$
- $C_{11}^\lambda := x^\lambda$

A cell-chain in the sense of the second, abstract definition is given by

$$0 \subseteq (x^{n-1}) \subseteq (x^{n-2}) \subseteq \ldots \subseteq (x^1) \subseteq (x^0)=R[x]/(x^n)$$

=== Matrix examples ===
$R^{\,d \times d}$ is cellular. A cell datum is given by $i(A)=A^T$ and

- $\Lambda := \lbrace 1 \rbrace$
- $M(1) := \lbrace 1,\dots,d\rbrace$
- For the basis one chooses $C_{st}^1 := E_{st}$ the standard matrix units, i.e. $C_{st}^1$ is the matrix with all entries equal to zero except the (s,t)-th entry which is equal to 1.

A cell-chain (and in fact the only cell chain) is given by

$$0 \subseteq R^{\!d \times d}$$

In some sense all cellular algebras "interpolate" between these two extremes by arranging matrix-algebra-like pieces according to the poset $\Lambda$.

=== Further examples ===
Modulo minor technicalities all Iwahori–Hecke algebras of finite type are cellular with respect to the involution that maps the standard basis as $T_w\mapsto T_{w^{-1}}$. This includes for example the integral group algebra of the symmetric groups as well as all other finite Weyl groups.

A basic Brauer tree algebra over a field is cellular if and only if the Brauer tree is a straight line (with arbitrary number of exceptional vertices).

Further examples include q-Schur algebras, the Brauer algebra, the Temperley–Lieb algebra, the Birman–Murakami–Wenzl algebra, the blocks of the Bernstein–Gelfand–Gelfand category $\mathcal{O}$ of a semisimple Lie algebra.

== Representations ==
=== Cell modules and the invariant bilinear form ===
Assume $A$ is cellular and $(\Lambda,i,M,C)$ is a cell datum for $A$. Then one defines the cell module $W(\lambda)$ as the free $R$-module with basis $\lbrace C_\mathfrak{s} \mid \mathfrak{s} \in M(\lambda)\rbrace$ and multiplication

$$aC_\mathfrak{s} := \sum_{\mathfrak{u}} r_a(\mathfrak{u},\mathfrak{s}) C_\mathfrak{u}$$

where the coefficients $r_a(\mathfrak{u},\mathfrak{s})$ are the same as above. Then $W(\lambda)$ becomes an $A$-left module.

These modules generalize the Specht modules for the symmetric group and the Hecke-algebras of type A.

There is a canonical bilinear form $\phi_\lambda: W(\lambda)\times W(\lambda)\to R$ which satisfies

$$C_\mathfrak{st}^\lambda C_\mathfrak{uv}^\lambda \equiv \phi_\lambda(C_\mathfrak{t},C_\mathfrak{u}) C_\mathfrak{sv}^\lambda \mod A(<\lambda)$$

for all indices $s,t,u,v\in M(\lambda)$.

One can check that $\phi_\lambda$ is symmetric in the sense that

$$\phi_\lambda(x,y) = \phi_\lambda(y,x)$$

for all $x,y\in W(\lambda)$ and also $A$-invariant in the sense that

$$\phi_\lambda(i(a)x,y)=\phi_\lambda(x,ay)$$

for all $a\in A$,$x,y\in W(\lambda)$.

=== Simple modules ===
Assume for the rest of this section that the ring $R$ is a field. With the information contained in the invariant bilinear forms one can easily list all simple $A$-modules:

Let $\Lambda_0:=\lbrace \lambda\in\Lambda \mid \phi_\lambda\neq 0\rbrace$ and define $L(\lambda):=W(\lambda)/\operatorname{rad}(\phi_\lambda)$ for all $\lambda\in\Lambda_0$. Then all $L(\lambda)$ are absolute simple $A$-modules and every simple $A$-module is one of these.

These theorems appear already in the original paper by Graham and Lehrer.

== Properties of cellular algebras ==
=== Persistence properties ===
- Tensor products of finitely many cellular $R$-algebras are cellular.
- A $R$-algebra $A$ is cellular if and only if its opposite algebra $A^{\text{op}}$ is.
- If $A$ is cellular with cell-datum $(\Lambda,i,M,C)$ and $\Phi\subseteq\Lambda$ is an ideal (a downward closed subset) of the poset $\Lambda$ then $A(\Phi):=\sum RC_\mathfrak{st}^\lambda$ (where the sum runs over $\lambda\in\Lambda$ and $s,t\in M(\lambda)$) is a two-sided, $i$-invariant ideal of $A$ and the quotient $A/A(\Phi)$ is cellular with cell datum $(\Lambda\setminus\Phi,i,M,C)$ (where i denotes the induced involution and M, C denote the restricted mappings).
- If $A$ is a cellular $R$-algebra and $R\to S$ is a unitary homomorphism of commutative rings, then the extension of scalars $S\otimes_R A$ is a cellular $S$-algebra.
- Direct products of finitely many cellular $R$-algebras are cellular.

If $R$ is an integral domain then there is a converse to this last point:

- If $(A,i)$ is a finite-dimensional $R$-algebra with an involution and $A=A_1\oplus A_2$ a decomposition in two-sided, $i$-invariant ideals, then the following are equivalent:
1. $(A,i)$ is cellular.
2. $(A_1,i)$ and $(A_2,i)$ are cellular.
- Since in particular all blocks of $A$ are $i$-invariant if $(A,i)$ is cellular, an immediate corollary is that a finite-dimensional $R$-algebra is cellular w.r.t. $i$ if and only if all blocks are $i$-invariant and cellular w.r.t. $i$.
- Tits' deformation theorem for cellular algebras: Let $A$ be a cellular $R$-algebra. Also let $R\to k$ be a unitary homomorphism into a field $k$ and $K:=\operatorname{Quot}(R)$ the quotient field of $R$. Then the following holds: If $kA$ is semisimple, then $KA$ is also semisimple.

If one further assumes $R$ to be a local domain, then additionally the following holds:

- If $A$ is cellular w.r.t. $i$ and $e\in A$ is an idempotent such that $i(e)=e$, then the algebra $eAe$ is cellular.

=== Other properties ===
Assuming that $R$ is a field (though a lot of this can be generalized to arbitrary rings, integral domains, local rings or at least discrete valuation rings) and $A$ is cellular w.r.t. the involution $i$. Then the following hold

- $A$ is split, i.e. all simple modules are absolutely irreducible.
- The following are equivalent:
1. $A$ is semisimple.
2. $A$ is split semisimple.
3. $\forall\lambda\in\Lambda: W(\lambda)$ is simple.
4. $\forall\lambda\in\Lambda: \phi_\lambda$ is nondegenerate.
- The Cartan matrix $C_A$ of $A$ is symmetric and positive definite.
- The following are equivalent:
1. $A$ is quasi-hereditary (i.e. its module category is a highest-weight category).
2. $\Lambda=\Lambda_0$.
3. All cell chains of $(A,i)$ have the same length.
4. All cell chains of $(A,j)$ have the same length where $j:A\to A$ is an arbitrary involution w.r.t. which $A$ is cellular.
5. $\det(C_A)=1$.
- If $A$ is Morita equivalent to $B$ and the characteristic of $R$ is not two, then $B$ is also cellular w.r.t. a suitable involution. In particular $A$ is cellular (to some involution) if and only if its basic algebra is.
- Every idempotent $e\in A$ is equivalent to $i(e)$, i.e. $Ae\cong Ai(e)$. If $\operatorname{char}(R) \neq 2$ then in fact every equivalence class contains an $i$-invariant idempotent.
