= List of things named after Erich Hecke =

These are things named after Erich Hecke, a German mathematician.

- Hecke algebra
  - Hecke algebra of a locally compact group
  - Hecke algebra of a finite group
  - Hecke algebra of a pair
  - Hecke polynomial
  - Iwahori–Hecke algebra
- Affine Hecke algebra
  - Double affine Hecke algebra
- Hecke algebra (disambiguation)
- Hecke character
- Hecke congruence subgroup
- Hecke correspondence
- Hecke eigenform
- Hecke group
- Hecke L-function (disambiguation)
- Hecke operator
- Hecke ring
