= Hecke algebra (disambiguation) =

In mathematics, a Hecke algebra is classically the algebra of Hecke operators studied by Erich Hecke. It may also refer to one of several algebras generalizing the classical Hecke algebra:

- Hecke algebra of a pair (G,K) where G is a reductive Lie group and K is a compact subgroup of G.
  - Hecke algebra of a finite group, the algebra spanned by the double cosets HgH of a subgroup H of a finite group G.
  - Iwahori–Hecke algebra of a Coxeter group, corresponding to the case when G is the finite Chevalley group over a finite field and K is its Borel subgroup.
- Affine Hecke algebra
