= Hecke algebra of a pair =

In mathematics, the Hecke algebra of a pair (G, K) of locally compact or reductive Lie groups is an algebra of measures under convolution. It can also be defined for a pair (g, K) of a maximal compact subgroup K of a Lie group with Lie algebra g, in which case the Hecke algebra is an algebra with an approximate identity, whose approximately unital modules are the same as K-finite representations of the pairs (g, K).

The Hecke algebra of a pair is a generalization of the classical Hecke algebra studied by Erich Hecke, which corresponds to the case (GL_{2}(Q), GL_{2}(Z)).

== Locally compact group and a compact subgroup ==
Let (G, K) be a pair consisting of a unimodular locally compact topological group G and a closed compact subgroup K of G. Then the space of bi-K-invariant continuous functions of compact support

C_{c}^{∞}[K\G/K]

can be endowed with a structure of an associative algebra under the operation of convolution. This algebra is often denoted

H(G//K)

and called the Hecke algebra of the pair (G, K).

=== Properties ===
If (G, K) is as above, then the Hecke algebra is commutative if and only if (G, K) is a Gelfand pair.

== Reductive Lie groups and Lie algebras ==
In 1979, Daniel Flath gave a similar construction for general reductive Lie groups G. The Hecke algebra of a pair (g, K) of a Lie algebra g with Lie group G and maximal compact subgroup K is the algebra of K-finite distributions on G with support in K, with the product given by convolution.

== Examples ==
=== Finite groups ===
When G is a finite group and K is any subgroup of G, then the Hecke algebra is spanned by double cosets of K\G/K.

=== SL(n) over a p-adic field ===
For the special linear group over the p-adic numbers,

G = SL_{n}(Q_{p}) and K = SL_{n}(Z_{p}),

the representations of the corresponding commutative Hecke ring were studied by Ian G. Macdonald.

=== GL(2) over the rationals ===
For the general linear group over the rational numbers,

G = GL_{2}(Q) and K = GL_{2}(Z)

the Hecke algebra of the pair (G, K) is the classical Hecke algebra, which is the commutative ring of Hecke operators in the theory of modular forms.

=== Iwahori ===
The case leading to the Iwahori–Hecke algebra of a finite Weyl group is when G is the finite Chevalley group over a finite field with p^{k} elements, and B is its Borel subgroup. Iwahori showed that the Hecke ring

H(G//B)

is obtained from the generic Hecke algebra H_{q} of the Weyl group W of G by specializing the indeterminate q of the latter algebra to p^{k}, the cardinality of the finite field. George Lusztig remarked in 1984:

I think it would be most appropriate to call it the Iwahori algebra, but the name Hecke ring (or algebra) given by Iwahori himself has been in use for almost 20 years and it is probably too late to change it now.

Iwahori and Matsumoto (1965) considered the case when G is a group of points of a reductive algebraic group over a non-archimedean local field F, such as Q_{p}, and K is what is now called an Iwahori subgroup of G. The resulting Hecke ring is isomorphic to the Hecke algebra of the affine Weyl group of G, or the affine Hecke algebra, where the indeterminate q has been specialized to the cardinality of the residue field of F.
