= Category O =

In the representation theory of semisimple Lie algebras, Category O (or category $\mathcal{O}$) is a category whose objects are certain representations of a semisimple Lie algebra, and whose morphisms are homomorphisms of representations.

== Introduction ==
Assume that $\mathfrak{g}$ is a (usually complex) semisimple Lie algebra with a Cartan subalgebra $\mathfrak{h}$. Let $\Phi$ be its root system and let $\Phi^+$ be a choice of positive roots. Denote by $\mathfrak{g}_\alpha$ the root space corresponding to a root $\alpha\in\Phi$, and set $\mathfrak{n}:=\bigoplus_{\alpha\in\Phi^+}\mathfrak{g}_\alpha$, a nilpotent subalgebra.

If $M$ is a $\mathfrak{g}$-module and $\lambda\in\mathfrak{h}^*$, then the $\lambda$-weight space of $M$ is

$$M_\lambda=\{v\in M:\forall h\in\mathfrak{h},\; h\cdot v=\lambda(h)v\}.$$

== Definition of category O ==
The objects of category $\mathcal O$ are $\mathfrak{g}$-modules $M$ such that:

1. $M$ is finitely generated;
2. $M=\bigoplus_{\lambda\in\mathfrak{h}^*} M_\lambda$;
3. $M$ is locally $\mathfrak{n}$-finite, i.e. for each $v\in M$, the $\mathfrak{n}$-submodule generated by $v$ is finite-dimensional.

Morphisms in this category are the $\mathfrak{g}$-module homomorphisms.

== Basic properties ==
- Each module in category $\mathcal O$ has finite-dimensional weight spaces.
- Each module in category $\mathcal O$ is a Noetherian module.
- $\mathcal O$ is an abelian category.
- $\mathcal O$ has enough projectives and enough injectives.
- $\mathcal O$ is closed under taking submodules, quotients, and finite direct sums.
- Objects in $\mathcal O$ are $Z(\mathfrak{g})$-finite: if $M$ is an object and $v\in M$, then the subspace $Z(\mathfrak{g})v\subseteq M$ generated by $v$ under the action of the center of the universal enveloping algebra is finite-dimensional.

== Koszul duality ==
A homological feature of category $\mathcal O$ is that, after choosing graded lifts of blocks, certain blocks can be described by Koszul algebras. In particular, Beilinson, Ginzburg, and Soergel showed that (for suitable graded realizations) the endomorphism algebra of a projective generator of a block (notably the principal block) is a Koszul algebra $A$. Equivalently, the corresponding graded block of $\mathcal O$ is (via a projective generator) equivalent to the category of finite-dimensional graded modules over $A$.

In this setting, Koszul duality relates two graded blocks: one block is equivalent to $\mathrm{gr}\text{-}A$, while a second (dual) graded block is equivalent to $\mathrm{gr}\text{-}A^{!}$, where $A^{!}$ is the Koszul dual algebra of $A$. The associated Koszul duality functors induce a triangulated equivalence between the bounded derived categories of these graded realizations, i.e. an equivalence of the form

$$D^{b}(\mathcal O_{\mathrm{block}}^{\mathrm{gr}})\;\simeq\;D^{b}(\mathcal O_{\mathrm{block}^\vee}^{\mathrm{gr}}),$$

where $\mathcal O_{\mathrm{block}}^{\mathrm{gr}}\simeq \mathrm{gr}\text{-}A$ and $\mathcal O_{\mathrm{block}^\vee}^{\mathrm{gr}}\simeq \mathrm{gr}\text{-}A^{!}$.

Koszul duality for category $\mathcal O$ is closely connected with geometric and combinatorial structures such as the geometry of the flag variety, perverse sheaves, and Kazhdan–Lusztig theory.

== Examples ==
- All finite-dimensional $\mathfrak{g}$-modules and their $\mathfrak{g}$-homomorphisms are in category $\mathcal O$.
- Verma modules and generalized Verma modules and their $\mathfrak{g}$-homomorphisms are in category $\mathcal O$.

== See also ==
- Highest-weight module
- Universal enveloping algebra
- Highest-weight category
- Koszul algebra
