= Brauer algebra =

Associative algebra introduced by Richard Brauer

In mathematics, a Brauer algebra is an associative algebra introduced by Richard Brauer in the context of the representation theory of the orthogonal group. It plays the same role that the symmetric group does for the representation theory of the general linear group in Schur–Weyl duality.

== Structure ==
The Brauer algebra $\mathfrak{B}_n(\delta)$ is a $\mathbb{Z}[\delta]$-algebra depending on the choice of a positive integer $n$. Here $\delta$ is an indeterminate, but in practice $\delta$ is often specialised to the dimension of the fundamental representation of an orthogonal group $O(\delta)$. The Brauer algebra has the dimension

$$\dim\mathfrak{B}_n(\delta) = \frac{(2n)!}{2^n n!} = (2n-1)!! = (2n-1)(2n-3)\cdots 5\cdot 3\cdot 1$$

=== Diagrammatic definition ===
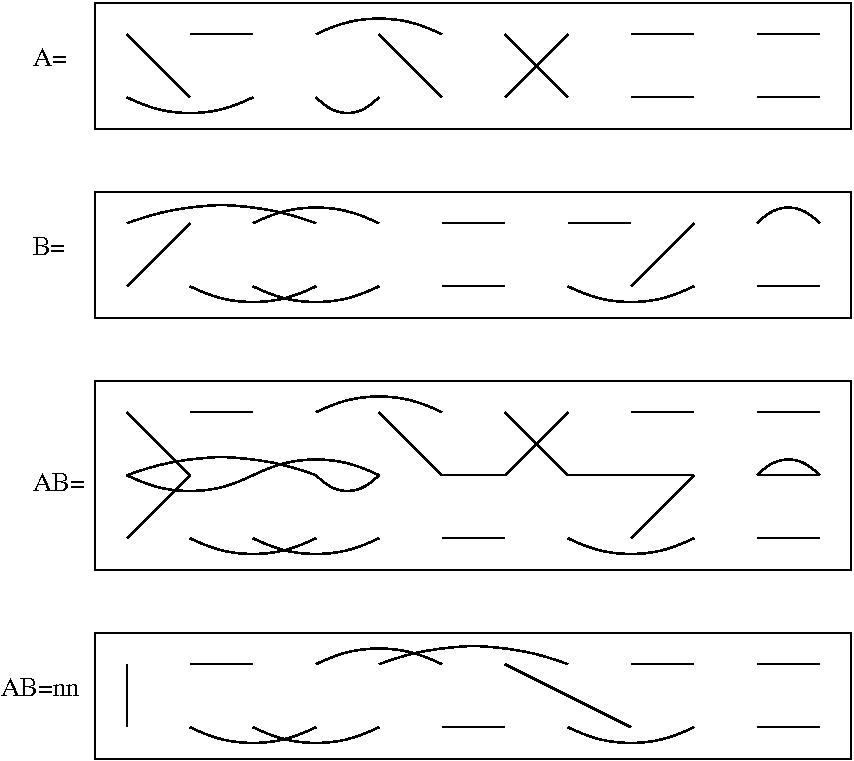
The product of 2 basis elements A and B of the Brauer algebra with n = 12

A basis of $\mathfrak{B}_n(\delta)$ consists of all pairings on a set of $2n$ elements $X_1, ..., X_n, Y_1, ..., Y_n$ (that is, all perfect matchings of a complete graph $K_{2n}$: any two of the $2n$ elements may be matched to each other, regardless of their symbols). The elements $X_i$ are usually written in a row, with the elements $Y_i$ beneath them.

The product of two basis elements $A$ and $B$ is obtained by concatenation: first identifying the endpoints in the bottom row of $A$ and the top row of $B$ (Figure AB in the diagram), then deleting the endpoints in the middle row and joining endpoints in the remaining two rows if they are joined, directly or by a path, in AB (Figure AB=nn in the diagram). Thereby all closed loops in the middle of AB are removed. The product $A\cdot B$ of the basis elements is then defined to be the basis element corresponding to the new pairing multiplied by $\delta^r$ where $r$ is the number of deleted loops. In the example $A\cdot B = \delta^{2} AB$.

=== Generators and relations ===
$\mathfrak{B}_n(\delta)$ can also be defined as the $\mathbb{Z}[\delta]$-algebra with generators $s_1,\ldots,s_{n-1}, e_1, \ldots, e_{n-1}$ satisfying the following relations:

- Relations of the symmetric group:

$$s_i^2 = 1$$
$s_i s_j = s_j s_i$ whenever $|i-j|>1$
$$s_i s_{i+1} s_i = s_{i+1} s_i s_{i+1}$$

- Almost-idempotent relation:

$$e_i^2 = \delta e_i$$

- Commutation:

$$e_i e_j = e_j e_i$$
$$s_i e_j = e_j s_i$$
whenever$|i-j|>1$

- Tangle relations

$$e_i e_{i\pm 1} e_i = e_i$$
$$s_i s_{i\pm 1} e_i = e_{i\pm 1} e_i$$
$$e_i s_{i\pm 1} s_i = e_i e_{i\pm 1}$$

- Untwisting:

$s_i e_i = e_i s_i = e_i$:
$$e_i s_{i\pm 1} e_i = e_i$$

In this presentation $s_i$ represents the diagram in which $X_k$ is always connected to $Y_k$ directly beneath it except for $X_i$ and $X_{i+1}$ which are connected to $Y_{i+1}$ and $Y_i$ respectively. Similarly $e_i$ represents the diagram in which $X_k$ is always connected to $Y_k$ directly beneath it except for $X_i$ being connected to $X_{i+1}$ and $Y_i$ to $Y_{i+1}$.

=== Basic properties ===
The Brauer algebra is a subalgebra of the partition algebra.

The Brauer algebra $\mathfrak{B}_n(\delta)$ is semisimple if $\delta\in\mathbb{C}-\{0,\pm 1,\pm 2,\dots,\pm n\}$.

The subalgebra of $\mathfrak{B}_n(\delta)$ generated by the generators $s_i$ is the group algebra of the symmetric group $S_n$.

The subalgebra of $\mathfrak{B}_n(\delta)$ generated by the generators $e_i$ is the Temperley-Lieb algebra $TL_n(\delta)$.

The Brauer algebra is a cellular algebra.

For a pairing $A$ let $n(A)$ be the number of closed loops formed by identifying $X_i$ with $Y_i$ for any $i=1,2,\dots,n$: then the Jones trace $\text{Tr}(A) = \delta^{n(A)}$ obeys $\text{Tr}(AB)=\text{Tr}(BA)$ i.e. it is indeed a trace.

== Representations ==
=== Brauer-Specht modules ===
Brauer-Specht modules are finite-dimensional modules of the Brauer algebra. If $\delta$ is such that $\mathfrak{B}_n(\delta)$ is semisimple, they form a complete set of simple modules of $\mathfrak{B}_n(\delta)$. These modules are parametrized by partitions, because they are built from the Specht modules of the symmetric group, which are themselves parametrized by partitions.

For $0\leq \ell \leq n$ with $\ell\equiv n\bmod 2$, let $B_{n,\ell}$ be the set of perfect matchings of $n+\ell$ elements $X_1,\dots ,X_n,Y_1,\dots ,Y_\ell$, such that $Y_j$ is matched with one of the $n$ elements $X_1,\dots ,X_n$. For any ring $k$, the space $kB_{n,\ell}$ is a left $\mathfrak{B}_n(\delta)$-module, where basis elements of $\mathfrak{B}_n(\delta)$ act by graph concatenation. (This action can produce matchings that violate the restriction that $Y_1,\dots ,Y_\ell$ cannot match with one another: such graphs must be modded out.) Moreover, the space $kB_{n,\ell}$ is a right $S_\ell$-module.

Given a Specht module $V_\lambda$ of $kS_\ell$, where $\lambda$ is a partition of $\ell$ (i.e. $|\lambda|=\ell$), the corresponding Brauer-Specht module of $\mathfrak{B}_n(\delta)$ is

$$W_{\lambda} = kB_{n,|\lambda|} \otimes_{kS_{|\lambda|}} V_\lambda \qquad \big(|\lambda|\leq n, |\lambda|\equiv n\bmod 2\big)$$

A basis of this module is the set of elements $b\otimes v$, where $b\in B_{n,|\lambda|}$ is such that the $|\lambda|$ lines that end on elements $Y_j$ do not cross, and $v$ belongs to a basis of $V_\lambda$. The dimension is

$$\dim(W_\lambda) = \binom{n}{|\lambda|} (n-|\lambda|-1)!! \dim(V_\lambda)$$

i.e. the product of a binomial coefficient, a double factorial, and the dimension of the corresponding Specht module, which is given by the hook length formula.

=== Schur-Weyl duality ===
Let $V=\mathbb{R}^d$ be a Euclidean vector space of dimension $d$, and $O(V)=O(d,\mathbb{R})$ the corresponding orthogonal group. Then write $B_n(d)$ for the specialisation $\mathbb{R}\otimes_{\mathbb{Z}[\delta]}\mathfrak{B}_n(\delta)$ where $\delta$ acts on $\mathbb{R}$ by multiplication with $d$. The tensor power $V^{\otimes n} := \underbrace{V\otimes\cdots\otimes V}_{n\text{ times}}$ is naturally a $B_n(d)$-module: $s_i$ acts by switching the $i$th and $(i+1)$th tensor factor and $e_i$ acts by contraction followed by expansion in the $i$th and $(i+1)$th tensor factor, i.e. $e_i$ acts as

$$v_1\otimes \cdots\otimes v_{i-1}\otimes\Big(v_i\otimes v_{i+1}\Big)\otimes\cdots \otimes v_n \mapsto v_1\otimes \cdots\otimes v_{i-1}\otimes\left(\langle v_i, v_{i+1}\rangle \sum_{k=1}^d (w_k\otimes w_k)\right)\otimes\cdots \otimes v_n$$

where $w_1,\ldots,w_d$ is any orthonormal basis of $V$. (The sum is in fact independent of the choice of this basis.)

This action is useful in a generalisation of the Schur-Weyl duality: if $d\geq n$, the image of $B_n(d)$ inside $\operatorname{End}(V^{\otimes n})$ is the centraliser of $O(V)$ inside $\operatorname{End}(V^{\otimes n})$, and conversely the image of $O(V)$ is the centraliser of $B_n(d)$. The tensor power $V^{\otimes n}$ is therefore both an $O(V)$- and a $B_n(d)$-module and satisfies

$$V^{\otimes n} = \bigoplus_{\lambda} U_\lambda \boxtimes W_\lambda$$

where $\lambda$ runs over a subset of the partitions such that $|\lambda|\leq n$ and $|\lambda|\equiv n \bmod 2$, $U_\lambda$ is an irreducible $O(V)$-module, and $W_\lambda$ is a Brauer-Specht module of $B_n(d)$.

It follows that the Brauer algebra has a natural action on the space of polynomials on $V^n$, which commutes with the action of the orthogonal group.

If $\delta$ is a negative even integer, the Brauer algebra is related by Schur-Weyl duality to the symplectic group $\text{Sp}_{-\delta}(\mathbb{C})$, rather than the orthogonal group.

== Walled Brauer algebra ==
The walled Brauer algebra $\mathfrak{B}_{r,s}(\delta)$ is a subalgebra of $\mathfrak{B}_{r+s}(\delta)$. Diagrammatically, it consists of diagrams where the only allowed pairings are of the types $X_{i\leq r}-X_{j>r}$, $Y_{i\leq r}-Y_{j>r}$, $X_{i\leq r}-Y_{j\leq r}$, $X_{i>r} - Y_{j>r}$. This amounts to having a wall that separates $X_{i\leq r},Y_{i\leq r}$ from $X_{i>r},Y_{i>r}$, and requiring that $X-Y$ pairings cross the wall while $X-X,Y-Y$ pairings don't.

The walled Brauer algebra is generated by $\{s_i\}_{1\leq i\leq r+s-1,i\neq r} \cup\{e_r\}$. These generators obey the basic relations of $\mathfrak{B}_{r+s}(\delta)$ that involve them, plus the two relations

$$e_rs_{r+1}s_{r-1}e_r s_{r-1} = e_rs_{r+1}s_{r-1}e_r s_{r+1} \quad , \quad s_{r-1}e_rs_{r+1}s_{r-1}e_r  = s_{r+1}e_rs_{r+1}s_{r-1}e_r$$

(In $\mathfrak{B}_{r+s}(\delta)$, these two relations follow from the basic relations.)

For $\delta$ a natural integer, let $V$ be the natural representation of the general linear group $GL_\delta(\mathbb{C})$. The walled Brauer algebra $\mathfrak{B}_{r,s}(\delta)$ has a natural action on $V^{\otimes r}\otimes (V^*)^{\otimes s}$, which is related by Schur-Weyl duality to the action of $GL_\delta(\mathbb{C})$.

== See also ==
- Birman–Wenzl algebra, a deformation of the Brauer algebra.
