= Gustav Lehrer =

Australian mathematician

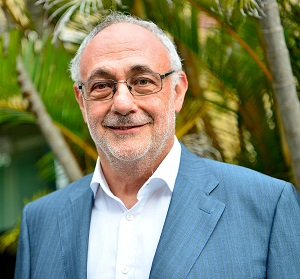
- Born: 1947 (age 78–79)
- Citizenship: Australia
- Education: University of Sydney (BSc Hons.), University of Warwick (PhD)
- Known for: Cellular algebra; Representation theory of finite reductive groups; Complex reflection groups; Topology of configuration spaces; Invariant theory
- Awards: Humboldt Research Award (1999); Australian Academy of Science fellowship (1998); Centenary Medal (2001); Australian Research Council fellowship (2014); Hannan Medal (2015); George Szekeres Medal (2016); Member of the Order of Australia (AM) (2016)
- Scientific career
- Fields: Algebraic geometry; Group theory; Representation theory; Topology
- Workplaces: University of Sydney; Australian National University; Australian Academy of Science
- Thesis: On the discrete series characters of linear groups (1971)
- Doctoral advisor: James Alexander Green
- Notable students: Ian Grojnowski, Geordie Williamson

Gustav Lehrer (born 1947) is an Australian mathematician and researcher. He is known for his work in algebraic geometry, group theory, representation theory, and topology. Along with his doctoral student John Graham, Lehrer is credited with the discovery of cellular algebras.

Lehrer is also noted for his parametrization of the characters of the finite special linear groups, the development of a theory for decomposition of characters induced from parabolic subgroups (with Robert Howlett), and the determination of the action of a complex reflection group on the cohomology of the complement of its reflecting hyperplanes.

== Early life and education ==
Gustav Lehrer was born in 1947 in Munich, Germany. His parents were holocaust survivors originally from Poland, and the family emigrated to Australia when Lehrer was 3 years old. He completed his BSc degree in mathematics from the University of Sydney in 1967. He then completed his PhD in mathematics in 1971 at the University of Warwick under the supervision of James Alexander "Sandy" Green. His doctoral thesis was titled On the discrete series characters of linear groups.

== Career ==
Lehrer served as a lecturer in the United Kingdom at the University of Warwick and the University of Birmingham from 1971 until returning to Australia in 1974 to take a position as a lecturer at the University of Sydney. In 1991, Lehrer was appointed head of the School of Mathematics and Statistics at the University of Sydney. From 1996 to 1998, Lehrer was Head of the Centre for Mathematics and its Applications (CMA) at the Australian National University. In 2007, he became of a member of the Mathematical Sciences Sectional Committee of the Australian Academy of Science.

Through the course of his career, he was a guest lecturer worldwide, including the Institute for Mathematical Research in Zurich, the University of Aarhaus, the University of Essen, the Ecole Normale Superieure, and the Science University of Tokyo.

Lehrer is a member of the Board of Governors of Tel Aviv University, and from 2011-2022 was the President of the Sydney Jewish Museum. He was a member of the Board of Trustees of Sydney Grammar School from 1995 to 2022.

== Research ==
Much of Lehrer's research has centered around representation theory. His doctoral thesis dealt with the issue of representing finite Lie groups. Throughout his time in the UK, he researched linear groups. During this period, his work was influenced by David Mumford, who lectured at the University of Warwick during Lehrer's time there. Upon returning to Australia, Lehrer collaborated with Robert Howlett to solve Springer's decomposition problem, resulting in the development of the Howlett-Lehrer theory. This theory subsequently had applications in a number of other fields of mathematics, including contributing to the development of the Deligne-Lusztig theory.

Lehrer contributed significantly to the problem of determining the geometry of the space of configurations of n distinct points in a complex plane, which is a problem in topology with relations to knot theory, developing novel algebraic geometric, topological, and analytical approaches.

Lehrer is perhaps best known for the invention of cellular algebras with John Graham, which provide a means of "deforming" structures which split into more complicated structures which do not. Cellular algebras have a range of applications in physics, including the theory of quantum groups.

In 2014, Lehrer solved the second fundamental problem of invariant theory of the orthogonal group, which had remained unsolved for 75 years. The problem involved the relationship between different quantities that remain the same after undergoing geometric transformation.

== Awards and honors ==
He was made a fellow of the Australian Academy of Science in 1998, and received an Australian Research Council senior fellowship from 1999-2004. Lehrer was granted the Humboldt research award in 1999. In 2001, he won the Centenary medal "for service to Australian society and science in pure mathematics." In 2005, he was made a professorial fellow of the Australian Research Council. Lehrer also received a visiting fellowship at All Souls College, Oxford. He received the Hannan medal in 2015. In 2016, Lehrer became a Member of the Order of Australia (AM) for "significant service to tertiary mathematics education (as an academic and researcher), and to professional and community groups."

Volume 311 of the Journal of Algebra was dedicated to Lehrer on his 60th birthday in 2009.

== Personal life ==
Lehrer is married to Nanna Lehrer with three children; Lisa, Alex, and Eddie.

== Selected works ==
- Gustav Lehrer, Ruibin Zhang, The Brauer category and invariant theory, Journal of the European Mathematical Society 2015
- Gustav Lehrer, Donald E. Taylor, Unitary Reflection Groups, Australian Mathematical Society Lecture Series 20, Cambridge University Press 2009
- John J. Graham, Gustav Lehrer, The representation theory of affine Temperley-Lieb algebras, Enseignement Mathematique 1998
- John J. Graham, Gustav Lehrer, Cellular Algebras, Inventiones Mathematicae 1996
- Gustav Leher, Louis Solomon, On the action of the symmetric group on the cohomology of the complement of its reflecting hyperplanes, Journal of Algebra 1986
- Robert Howlett, Gustav Lehrer, Induced cuspidal representations and generalised Hecke rings, Inventiones Mathematicae 1980
