= Birman–Wenzl algebra =

Family of algebras

In mathematics, the Birman–Murakami–Wenzl (BMW) algebra, introduced by Joan Birman and Hans Wenzl (1989) and Jun Murakami (1987), is a two-parameter family of algebras $\mathrm{C}_n(\ell,m)$ of dimension $1\cdot 3\cdot 5\cdots (2n-1)$ having the Hecke algebra of the symmetric group as a quotient. It is related to the Kauffman polynomial of a link. It is a deformation of the Brauer algebra in much the same way that Hecke algebras are deformations of the group algebra of the symmetric group.

== Definition ==
For each natural number n, the BMW algebra $\mathrm{C}_n(\ell,m)$ is generated by $G_1^{\pm1},G_2^{\pm1},\dots, G_{n-1}^{\pm1},E_1,E_2,\dots,E_{n-1}$ and relations:

$$G_iG_j = G_jG_i, \mathrm{if} \left\vert i-j \right\vert \geq 2,$$

$G_i G_{i+1} G_i = G_{i+1} G_i G_{i+1},$ $E_i E_{i\pm1} E_i = E_i,$

$$G_i + {G_i}^{-1} = m(1+E_i),$$

$G_{i\pm1} G_i E_{i\pm1} = E_i G_{i\pm1} G_i = E_i E_{i\pm1},$ $G_{i\pm1} E_i G_{i\pm1} ={G_i}^{-1} E_{i\pm1} {G_i}^{-1},$

$G_{i\pm1} E_i E_{i\pm1} = {G_i}^{-1} E_{i\pm1},$ $E_{i\pm1} E_i G_{i\pm1} =E_{i\pm1} {G_i}^{-1},$

$G_i E_i= E_i G_i = l^{-1} E_i,$ $E_i G_{i\pm1} E_i = l E_i.$

These relations imply the further relations:

$E_i E_j=E_j E_i, \mathrm{if} \left\vert i-j \right\vert \geq 2,$
$(E_i)^2 = (m^{-1}(l+l^{-1})-1) E_i,$
$${G_i}^2 = m(G_i+l^{-1}E_i)-1.$$

This is the original definition given by Birman and Wenzl. However a slight change by the introduction of some minus signs is sometimes made, in accordance with Kauffman's 'Dubrovnik' version of his link invariant. In that way, the fourth relation in Birman & Wenzl's original version is changed to

1. (Kauffman skein relation)
  $$G_i - {G_i}^{-1}=m(1-E_i),$$

Given invertibility of m, the rest of the relations in Birman & Wenzl's original version can be reduced to

2. (Idempotent relation)
  $$(E_i)^2 = (m^{-1}(l-l^{-1})+1) E_i,$$
3. (Braid relations)
  $$G_iG_j=G_jG_i, \text{if } \left\vert i-j \right\vert \geqslant 2, \text{ and } G_i G_{i+1} G_i=G_{i+1} G_i G_{i+1},$$
4. (Tangle relations)
  $$E_i E_{i\pm1} E_i=E_i \text{ and }  G_i G_{i\pm1} E_i = E_{i\pm1} E_i,$$
5. (Delooping relations)
  $$G_i E_i= E_i G_i = l^{-1} E_i \text{ and } E_i G_{i\pm1} E_i =l E_i.$$

== Properties ==
- The dimension of $\mathrm{C}_n(\ell,m)$ is $(2n)!/(2^nn! )$.
- The Iwahori–Hecke algebra associated with the symmetric group $S_n$ is a quotient of the Birman–Murakami–Wenzl algebra $\mathrm{C}_n$.
- The Artin braid group embeds in the BMW algebra: $B_n \hookrightarrow \mathrm{C}_n$.

== Isomorphism between the BMW algebras and Kauffman's tangle algebras ==
It is proved by Morton & Wassermann (1989) that the BMW algebra $\mathrm{C}_n(\ell,m)$ is isomorphic to the Kauffman's tangle algebra $\mathrm{KT}_n$. The isomorphism $\phi \colon \mathrm{C}_n \to \mathrm{KT}_n$ is defined by
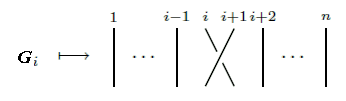
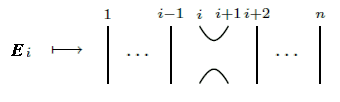
and

== Baxterisation of Birman–Murakami–Wenzl algebra ==
Define the face operator as

$$U_i(u) = 1- \frac{i\sin u}{\sin \lambda \sin \mu}(e^{i(u-\lambda)} G_i -e^{-i(u-\lambda)}{G_i}^{-1})$$,

where $\lambda$ and $\mu$ are determined by

$$2\cos \lambda = 1+(l-l^{-1})/m$$

and

$$2\cos \lambda = 1+(l-l^{-1})/(\lambda \sin \mu)$$.

Then the face operator satisfies the Yang–Baxter equation.

$$U_{i+1}(v) U_i(u+v) U_{i+1}(u) = U_i(u) U_{i+1}(u+v) U_i(v)$$

Now $E_i=U_i(\lambda)$ with

$$\rho(u)=\frac{\sin (\lambda-u) \sin (\mu+u)}{\sin \lambda \sin \mu}$$.

In the limits $u \to \pm i \infty$, the braids ${G_j}^{\pm}$ can be recovered up to a scale factor.

== History ==
In 1984, Vaughan Jones introduced a new polynomial invariant of link isotopy types which is called the Jones polynomial. The invariants are related to the traces of irreducible representations of Hecke algebras associated with the symmetric groups. Murakami (1987) showed that the Kauffman polynomial can also be interpreted as a function $F$ on a certain associative algebra. In 1989, Birman & Wenzl (1989) constructed a two-parameter family of algebras $\mathrm{C}_n(\ell,m)$ with the Kauffman polynomial $K_n(\ell,m)$ as trace after appropriate renormalization.
