= Temperley–Lieb algebra =

Algebra in statistical mechanics

In statistical mechanics, the Temperley–Lieb algebra is an algebra from which are built certain transfer matrices, invented by Neville Temperley and Elliott Lieb. It is also related to integrable models, knot theory and the braid groups, quantum groups and subfactors of von Neumann algebras.

== Structure ==
=== Generators and relations ===
Let $R$ be a commutative ring and fix $\delta \in R$. The Temperley–Lieb algebra $TL_n(\delta)$ is the unital associative $R$-algebra generated by the elements $e_1, e_2, \ldots, e_{n-1}$, subject to the Jones relations:

- $e_i^2 = \delta e_i$ for all $1 \leq i \leq n-1$
- $e_i e_{i+1} e_i = e_i$ for all $1 \leq i \leq n-2$
- $e_i e_{i-1} e_i = e_i$ for all $2 \leq i \leq n-1$
- $e_i e_j = e_j e_i$ for all $1 \leq i,j \leq n-1$ such that $|i-j| \neq 1$

Using these relations, any product of generators $e_i$ can be brought to Jones' normal form:

$$E= \big(e_{i_1}e_{i_1-1}\cdots e_{j_1}\big)\big(e_{i_2}e_{i_2-1}\cdots e_{j_2}\big)\cdots\big(e_{i_r}e_{i_r-1}\cdots e_{j_r}\big)$$

where $(i_1,i_2,\dots,i_r)$ and $(j_1,j_2,\dots,j_r)$ are two strictly increasing sequences in $\{1,2,\dots,n-1\}$. Elements of this type form a basis of the Temperley-Lieb algebra.

The dimensions of Temperley-Lieb algebras are Catalan numbers:

$$\dim(TL_n(\delta)) = \frac{(2n)!}{n!(n+1)!}$$

The Temperley–Lieb algebra $TL_n(\delta)$ is a subalgebra of the Brauer algebra $\mathfrak{B}_n(\delta)$, and therefore also of the partition algebra $P_n(\delta)$. The Temperley–Lieb algebra $TL_n(\delta)$ is semisimple for $\delta\in\mathbb{C}-F_n$ where $F_n$ is a known, finite set. For a given $n$, all semisimple Temperley-Lieb algebras are isomorphic.

=== Diagram algebra ===
$TL_n(\delta)$ may be represented diagrammatically as the vector space over noncrossing pairings of $2n$ points on two opposite sides of a rectangle with n points on each of the two sides.

The identity element is the diagram in which each point is connected to the one directly across the rectangle from it. The generator $e_i$ is the diagram in which the $i$-th and $(i+1)$-th point on the left side are connected to each other, similarly the two points opposite to these on the right side, and all other points are connected to the point directly across the rectangle.

The generators of $TL_5(\delta)$ are:

From left to right, the unit 1 and the generators $e_1$, $e_2$, $e_3$, $e_4$.

Multiplication on basis elements can be performed by concatenation: placing two rectangles side by side, and replacing any closed loops by a factor $\delta$, for example $e_1 e_4 e_3 e_2\times e_2 e_4 e_3=\delta\,e_1 e_4 e_3 e_2 e_4 e_3$:

× = = $\delta$ .

The Jones relations can be seen graphically:

= $\delta$

=

=

The five basis elements of $TL_3(\delta)$ are the following:

.

From left to right, the unit 1, the generators $e_2$, $e_1$, and $e_1 e_2$, $e_2 e_1$.

== Representations ==
=== Structure ===
For $\delta$ such that $TL_n(\delta)$ is semisimple, a complete set $\{W_\ell\}$ of simple modules is parametrized by integers $0\leq \ell\leq n$ with $\ell\equiv n\bmod 2$. The dimension of a simple module is written in terms of binomial coefficients as

$$\dim(W_\ell) = \binom{n}{\frac{n-\ell}{2}} - \binom{n}{\frac{n-\ell}{2}-1}$$

A basis of the simple module $W_\ell$ is the set $M_{n,\ell}$ of monic noncrossing pairings from $n$ points on the left to $\ell$ points on the right. (Monic means that each point on the right is connected to a point on the left.) There is a natural bijection between
$\cup_{\begin{array}{c} 0\leq \ell\leq n \\ \ell\equiv n\bmod 2\end{array}}M_{n,\ell}\times M_{n,\ell}$, and the set of diagrams that generate $TL_n(\delta)$:

Any such diagram can be cut into two elements of $M_{n,\ell}$ for some $\ell$.

Then $TL_n(\delta)$ acts on $W_\ell$ by diagram concatenation from the left. (Concatenation can produce non-monic pairings, which have to be modded out.) The module $W_\ell$ may be called a standard module or link module.

If $\delta = q+q^{-1}$ with $q$ a root of unity, $TL_n(\delta)$ may not be semisimple, and $W_\ell$ may not be irreducible:

$$W_\ell \text{ reducible }  \iff \exists j\in\{1,2,\dots,\ell\}, \ q^{2n-4\ell+2+2j} =1$$

If $W_\ell$ is reducible, then its quotient by its maximal proper submodule is irreducible.

=== Branching rules from the Brauer algebra ===
Simple modules of the Brauer algebra $\mathfrak{B}_n(\delta)$ can be decomposed into simple modules of the Temperley-Lieb algebra. The decomposition is called a branching rule, and it is a direct sum with positive integer coefficients:

$$W_\lambda\left(\mathfrak{B}_n(\delta)\right)
= \bigoplus_{\begin{array}{c} |\lambda|\leq \ell\leq n \\ \ell\equiv |\lambda|\bmod 2\end{array}}
c_\ell^\lambda W_\ell\left(TL_n(\delta)\right)$$

The coefficients $c_\ell^\lambda$ do not depend on $n,\delta$, and are given by

$$c_\ell^\lambda = f^\lambda\sum_{r=0}^{\frac{\ell-|\lambda|}{2}} (-1)^r \binom{\ell-r}{r}\binom{\ell-2r}{\ell-|\lambda|-2r}(\ell-|\lambda|-2r)!!$$

where $f^\lambda$ is the number of standard Young tableaux of shape $\lambda$, given by the hook length formula.

== Affine Temperley-Lieb algebra ==
The affine Temperley-Lieb algebra $aTL_n(\delta)$ is an infinite-dimensional algebra such that $TL_n(\delta)\subset aTL_n(\delta)$. It is obtained by adding generators $e_n,\tau,\tau^{-1}$ such that

- $\tau e_i = e_{i+1}\tau$ for all $1 \leq i \leq n$,
- $e_1\tau^2 = e_1e_2 \cdots e_{n-1}$,
- $\tau \tau^{-1}=\tau^{-1}\tau = \text{id}$.

The indices are supposed to be periodic i.e. $e_{n+1}=e_1,e_n=e_0$, and the Temperley-Lieb relations are supposed to hold for all $1 \leq i \leq n$. Then $\tau^n$ is central. A finite-dimensional quotient of the algebra $aTL_n(\delta)$, sometimes called the unoriented Jones-Temperley-Lieb algebra, is obtained by assuming $\tau^n=\text{id}$, and replacing non-contractible lines with the same factor $\delta$ as contractible lines (for example, in the case $n=4$, this implies $e_1e_3e_2e_4e_1e_3 = \delta^2 e_1e_3$).

The diagram algebra for $aTL_n(\delta)$ is deduced from the diagram algebra for $TL_n(\delta)$ by turning rectangles into cylinders. The algebra $aTL_n(\delta)$ is infinite-dimensional because lines can wind around the cylinder. If $n$ is even, there can even exist closed winding lines, which are non-contractible.

The Temperley-Lieb algebra is a quotient of the corresponding affine Temperley-Lieb algebra.

The cell module $W_{\ell,z}$ of $aTL_n(\delta)$ is generated by the set of monic pairings from $n$ points to $\ell$ points, just like the module $W_{\ell}$ of $TL_n(\delta)$. However, the pairings are now on a cylinder, and the right-multiplication with $\tau$ is identified with $z\cdot\text{id}$ for some $z\in\mathbb{C}^*$. If $\ell=0$, there is no right-multiplication by $\tau$, and it is the addition of a non-contractible loop on the right which is identified with $z+z^{-1}$. Cell modules are finite-dimensional, with

$$\dim(W_{\ell,z}) = \binom{n}{\frac{n-\ell}{2}}$$

The cell module $W_{\ell,z}$ is irreducible for all $z\in\mathbb{C}^*-R(\delta)$, where the set $R(\delta)$ is countable. For $z\in R(\delta)$, $W_{\ell,z}$ has an irreducible quotient. The irreducible cell modules and quotients thereof form a complete set of irreducible modules of $aTL_n(\delta)$. Cell modules of the unoriented Jones-Temperley-Lieb algebra must obey $z^\ell=1$ if $\ell\neq 0$, and $z+z^{-1} = \delta$ if $\ell=0$.

== Applications ==
=== Temperley–Lieb Hamiltonian ===
Consider an interaction-round-a-face model e.g. a square lattice model and let $n$ be the number of sites on the lattice. Following Temperley and Lieb we define the Temperley–Lieb Hamiltonian (the TL Hamiltonian) as

$\mathcal{H} = \sum_{j=1}^{n-1} (\delta - e_j)$

In what follows we consider the special case $\delta=1$.

We will firstly consider the case $n = 3$. The TL Hamiltonian is $\mathcal{H} = 2 - e_1 - e_2$, namely

$\mathcal{H}$ = 2 - - .

We have two possible states,

and .

In acting by $\mathcal{H}$ on these states, we find

$\mathcal{H}$ = 2 - - = - ,

and

$\mathcal{H}$ = 2 - - = - + .

Writing $\mathcal{H}$ as a matrix in the basis of possible states we have,

$\mathcal{H} = \left(\begin{array}{rr} 1 & -1\\ -1 & 1 \end{array}\right)$

The eigenvector of $\mathcal{H}$ with the lowest eigenvalue is known as the ground state. In this case, the lowest eigenvalue $\lambda_0$ for $\mathcal{H}$ is $\lambda_0 = 0$. The corresponding eigenvector is $\psi_0 = (1, 1)$. As we vary the number of sites $n$ we find the following table

$n$	$\psi_0$	$n$	$\psi_0$
2	(1)	3	(1, 1)
4	(2, 1)	5	$(3_3, 1_2)$
6	$(11, 5_2,4, 1)$	7	$(26_4, 10_2, 9_2, 8_2, 5_2, 1_2)$
8	$(170, 75_2, 71, 56_2, 50, 30, 14_4, 6, 1)$	9	$(646, \ldots)$
$\vdots$	$\vdots$	$\vdots$	$\vdots$

where we have used the notation $m_j = (m, \ldots, m)$ $j$-times e.g., $5_2 = (5, 5)$.

An interesting observation is that the largest components of the ground state of $\mathcal{H}$ have a combinatorial enumeration as we vary the number of sites, as was first observed by Murray Batchelor, Jan de Gier, and Bernard Nienhuis. Using the resources of the on-line encyclopedia of integer sequences, Batchelor et al. found, for an even numbers of sites

$1, 2, 11, 170, \ldots = \prod_{j=0}^{\frac{n-2}{2}} \left( 3j + 1\right)\frac{ (2j)!(6j)!}{(4j)!(4j + 1)!} \qquad (n = 2, 4, 6,\dots)$

and for an odd numbers of sites

$1, 3, 26, 646, \ldots = \prod_{j=0}^{\frac{n-3}{2}} (3j+2)\frac{ (2j + 1)!(6j + 3)!}{(4j + 2)!(4j + 3)!} \qquad (n=3, 5, 7, \dots)$

Surprisingly, these sequences corresponded to well known combinatorial objects. For $n$ even, this (sequence A051255 in the OEIS) corresponds to cyclically symmetric transpose complement plane partitions and for $n$ odd, (sequence A005156 in the OEIS), these correspond to alternating sign matrices symmetric about the vertical axis.

=== XXZ spin chain ===
Correlations for Temperley-Lieb models can be computed by means of the theory of factorized correlation functions of the XXZ spin chain (hidden Grassmann structure).
