= Highest-weight category =

Category theory

In the mathematical field of representation theory, a highest-weight category is a k-linear category C (here k is a field) that

- is locally artinian
- has enough injectives
- satisfies

$$B\cap\left(\bigcup_\alpha A_\alpha\right)=\bigcup_\alpha\left(B\cap A_\alpha\right)$$

for all subobjects B and each family of subobjects {A_{α}} of each object X

and such that there is a locally finite poset Λ (whose elements are called the weights of C) that satisfies the following conditions:

- The poset Λ indexes an exhaustive set of non-isomorphic simple objects {S(λ)} in C.
- Λ also indexes a collection of objects {A(λ)} of objects of C such that there exist embeddings S(λ) → A(λ) such that all composition factors S(μ) of A(λ)/S(λ) satisfy μ < λ.
- For all μ, λ in Λ,

$$\dim_k\operatorname{Hom}_k(A(\lambda),A(\mu))$$

is finite, and the multiplicity

$$[A(\lambda):S(\mu)]$$

is also finite.

- Each S(λ) has an injective envelope I(λ) in C equipped with an increasing filtration

$$0=F_0(\lambda)\subseteq F_1(\lambda)\subseteq\dots\subseteq I(\lambda)$$

such that
1. $F_1(\lambda)=A(\lambda)$
2. for n > 1, $F_n(\lambda)/F_{n-1}(\lambda)\cong A(\mu)$ for some μ = λ(n) > λ
3. for each μ in Λ, λ(n) = μ for only finitely many n
4. $\bigcup_iF_i(\lambda)=I(\lambda).$

== Examples ==
- The module category of the $k$-algebra of upper triangular $n\times n$ matrices over $k$.
- This concept is named after the category of highest-weight modules of Lie-algebras.
- A finite-dimensional $k$-algebra $A$ is quasi-hereditary iff its module category is a highest-weight category. In particular all module-categories over semisimple and hereditary algebras are highest-weight categories.
- A cellular algebra over a field is quasi-hereditary (and hence its module category a highest-weight category) iff its Cartan-determinant is 1.

== See also ==
- Category O
