= Akivis algebra =

In mathematics, and in particular the study of algebra, an Akivis algebra is a nonassociative algebra equipped with a binary operator, the commutator $[x,y]$ and a ternary operator, the associator $[x,y,z]$ that satisfy a particular relationship known as the Akivis identity. They are named in honour of Russian mathematician Maks A. Akivis.

Formally, if $A$ is a vector space over a field $\mathbb{F}$ of characteristic zero, we say $A$ is an akivis algebra if the operation $\left(x,y\right)\mapsto\left[x,y\right]$ is bilinear and anticommutative; and the trilinear operator $\left(x,y,z\right)\mapsto\left[x,y,z\right]$ satisfies the Akivis identity:

$$\left[\left[x,y\right],z\right]+
\left[\left[y,z\right],x\right]+
\left[\left[z,x\right],y\right]=
\left[x,y,z\right]+
\left[y,z,x\right]+
\left[z,x,y\right]-
\left[x,z,y\right]-
\left[y,x,z\right]-
\left[z,y,x\right].$$

An Akivis algebra with $\left[x,y,z\right]=0$ is a Lie algebra, for the Akivis identity reduces to the Jacobi identity. Note that the terms on the right hand side have positive sign for even permutations and negative sign for odd permutations of $x,y,z$.

Any algebra (even if nonassociative) is an Akivis algebra if we define $\left[x,y\right]=xy-yx$ and $\left[x,y,z\right]=(xy)z-x(yz)$. It is known that all Akivis algebras may be represented as a subalgebra of a (possibly nonassociative) algebra in this way (for associative algebras, the associator is identically zero, and the Akivis identity reduces to the Jacobi identity).
