= Schur algebra =

In mathematics, Schur algebras, named after Issai Schur, are certain finite-dimensional algebras closely associated with Schur–Weyl duality between general linear and symmetric groups. They are used to relate the representation theories of those two groups. Their use was promoted by the influential monograph of J. A. Green first published in 1980. The name "Schur algebra" is due to Green. In the modular case (over infinite fields of positive characteristic) Schur algebras were used by Gordon James and Karin Erdmann to show that the (still open) problems of computing decomposition numbers for general linear groups and symmetric groups are actually equivalent. Schur algebras were used by Friedlander and Suslin to prove finite generation of cohomology of finite group schemes.

== Construction ==
The Schur algebra $S_k(n, r)$ can be defined for any commutative ring $k$ and integers $n, r \geq 0$. Consider the algebra $k[x_{ij}]$ of polynomials (with coefficients in $k$) in $n^2$ commuting variables $x_{ij}$, 1 ≤ i, j ≤ $n$. Denote by $A_k(n, r)$ the homogeneous polynomials of degree $r$. Elements of $A_k(n, r)$ are k-linear combinations of monomials formed by multiplying together $r$ of the generators $x_{ij}$ (allowing repetition). Thus

$$k[x_{ij}] = \bigoplus_{r\ge 0} A_k(n, r).$$

Now, $k[x_{ij}]$ has a natural coalgebra structure with comultiplication $\Delta$ and counit $\varepsilon$ the algebra homomorphisms given on generators by

$\Delta(x_{ij}) = \textstyle\sum_l x_{il} \otimes x_{lj}, \quad \varepsilon(x_{ij}) = \delta_{ij}\quad$ (Kronecker's delta).

Since comultiplication is an algebra homomorphism, $k[x_{ij}]$ is a bialgebra. One easily checks that $A_k(n, r)$ is a subcoalgebra of the bialgebra $k[x_{ij}]$, for every r ≥ 0.

Definition. The Schur algebra (in degree $r$) is the algebra $S_k (n, r) = \mathrm{Hom}_k( A_k (n, r), k)$. That is, $S_k(n,r)$ is the linear dual of $A_k(n,r)$.

It is a general fact that the linear dual of a coalgebra $A$ is an algebra in a natural way, where the multiplication in the algebra is induced by dualizing the comultiplication in the coalgebra. To see this, let

$$\Delta(a) = \textstyle \sum a_i \otimes b_i$$

and, given linear functionals $f$, $g$ on $A$, define their product to be the linear functional given by

$$\textstyle a \mapsto \sum f(a_i) g(b_i).$$

The identity element for this multiplication of functionals is the counit in $A$.

== Main properties ==
- One of the most basic properties expresses $S_k(n,r)$ as a centralizer algebra. Let $V = k^n$ be the space of rank $n$ column vectors over $k$, and form the tensor power

$$V^{\otimes r} = V \otimes \cdots \otimes V \quad (r\text{ factors}).$$

Then the symmetric group $\mathfrak{S}_r$ on $r$ letters acts naturally on the tensor space by place permutation, and one has an isomorphism

$$S_k(n,r) \cong \mathrm{End}_{\mathfrak{S}_r} (V^{\otimes r}).$$

In other words, $S_k(n,r)$ may be viewed as the algebra of endomorphisms of tensor space commuting with the action of the symmetric group.

- $S_k(n,r)$ is free over $k$ of rank given by the binomial coefficient $\tbinom{n^2+r-1}{r}$.
- Various bases of $S_k(n,r)$ are known, many of which are indexed by pairs of semistandard Young tableaux of shape $\lambda$, as $\lambda$ varies over the set of partitions of $r$ into no more than $n$ parts.
- In case k is an infinite field, $S_k(n,r)$ may also be identified with the enveloping algebra (in the sense of H. Weyl) for the action of the general linear group $\mathrm{GL}_n(k)$ acting on $V^{\otimes r}$ (via the diagonal action on tensors, induced from the natural action of $\mathrm{GL}_n(k)$ on $V = k^n$ given by matrix multiplication).
- Schur algebras are "defined over the integers". This means that they satisfy the following change of scalars property:

$$S_k(n,r) \cong S_{\mathbb{Z}}(n,r) \otimes _{\mathbb{Z}} k$$
for any commutative ring $k$.

- Schur algebras provide natural examples of quasihereditary algebras (as defined by Cline, Parshall, and Scott), and thus have nice homological properties. In particular, Schur algebras have finite global dimension.

== Generalizations ==
- Generalized Schur algebras (associated to any reductive algebraic group) were introduced by Donkin in the 1980s. These are also quasihereditary.
- Around the same time, Dipper and James introduced the quantized Schur algebras (or q-Schur algebras for short), which are a type of q-deformation of the classical Schur algebras described above, in which the symmetric group is replaced by the corresponding Hecke algebra and the general linear group by an appropriate quantum group.
- There are also generalized q-Schur algebras, which are obtained by generalizing the work of Dipper and James in the same way that Donkin generalized the classical Schur algebras.
- There are further generalizations, such as the affine q-Schur algebras related to affine Kac–Moody Lie algebras and other generalizations, such as the cyclotomic q-Schur algebras related to Ariki-Koike algebras (which are q-deformations of certain complex reflection groups).

The study of these various classes of generalizations forms an active area of contemporary research.
