= Gelfand pair =

Mathematical object

In mathematics, a Gelfand pair is a pair (G, K ) consisting of a group G and a subgroup K (called an Euler subgroup of G) that satisfies a certain property on restricted representations. The theory of Gelfand pairs is closely related to the topic of spherical functions in the classical theory of special functions, and to the theory of Riemannian symmetric spaces in differential geometry. Broadly speaking, the theory exists to abstract from these theories their content in terms of harmonic analysis and representation theory.

When G is a finite group, the simplest definition is, roughly speaking, that the (K, K )-double cosets in G commute. More precisely, the Hecke algebra, the algebra of functions on G that are invariant under translation on either side by K, should be commutative for the convolution on G.

In general, the definition of Gelfand pair is roughly that the restriction to K of any irreducible representation of G contains the trivial representation of K with multiplicity no more than 1. In each case, one should specify the class of considered representations and the meaning of "contains".

== Definitions ==
In each area, the class of representations and the definition of containment for representations is slightly different. Explicit definitions of several such cases are given here.

=== Finite group case ===
When G is a finite group, the following are equivalent:

- (G, K) is a Gelfand pair.
- The algebra of (K, K)-double invariant functions on G with multiplication defined by convolution is commutative.
- For any irreducible representation π of G, the space π^{K} of K-invariant vectors in π is no more than one-dimensional.
- For any irreducible representation π of G, the dimension of Hom_{K}(π, C) is less than or equal to 1, where C denotes the trivial representation.
- The permutation representation of G on the cosets of K is multiplicity-free; that is, it decomposes into a direct sum of distinct absolutely irreducible representations in characteristic zero.
- The centralizer algebra (Schur algebra) of the permutation representation is commutative.
- (G/N, K/N) is a Gelfand pair, where N is a normal subgroup of G contained in K.

=== Compact group case ===
When G is a compact topological group, the following are equivalent:

- (G, K) is a Gelfand pair.
- The algebra of (K, K)-double invariant compactly supported continuous measures on G with multiplication defined by convolution is commutative.
- For any continuous, locally convex, irreducible representation π of G, the space π^{K} of K-invariant vectors in π is no more than one-dimensional.
- For any continuous, locally convex, irreducible representation π of G, the dimension of Hom_{K}(π,C) is less than or equal to 1.
- The representation L^{2}(G/K) of G is multiplicity-free; that is, it is a direct sum of distinct unitary irreducible representations.

=== Lie group with compact subgroup ===
When G is a Lie group and K is a compact subgroup, the following are equivalent:

- (G, K) is a Gelfand pair.
- The algebra of (K, K)-double invariant compactly supported continuous measures on G with multiplication defined by convolution is commutative.
- The algebra D(G/K)^{G} of G-invariant differential operators on G/K is commutative.
- For any continuous, locally convex, irreducible representation π of G, the space π^{K} of K-invariant vectors in π is no more than one-dimensional.
- For any continuous, locally convex, irreducible representation π of G, the dimension of Hom_{K}(π, C) is less than or equal to 1.
- The representation L^{2}(G/K) of G is multiplicity-free; that is, it is a direct integral of distinct unitary irreducible representations.

For a classification of such Gelfand pairs, see.

Classical examples of such Gelfand pairs are (G, K), where G is a reductive Lie group and K is a maximal compact subgroup.

=== Locally compact topological group with compact subgroup ===
When G is a locally compact topological group and K is a compact subgroup, the following are equivalent:

- (G, K) is a Gelfand pair.
- The algebra of (K, K)-double invariant compactly supported continuous measures on G with multiplication defined by convolution is commutative.
- For any continuous locally convex irreducible representation π of G, the space π^{K} of K-invariant vectors in π is no more than one-dimensional.
- For any continuous, locally convex, irreducible representation π of G, the dimension of Hom_{K}(π, C) is less than or equal to 1.
- The representation L^{2}(G/K) of G is multiplicity-free; that is, it is a direct integral of distinct unitary irreducible representations.

In that setting, G has an Iwasawa–Monod decomposition, namely G = K P for some amenable subgroup P of G. This is the abstract analogue of the Iwasawa decomposition of semisimple Lie groups.

=== Lie group with closed subgroup ===
When G is a Lie group and K is a closed subgroup, the pair (G,K) is called a generalized Gelfand pair if for any irreducible unitary representation π of G on a Hilbert space, the dimension of Hom_{K}(π, C) is less than or equal to 1, where π^{∞} denotes the subrepresentation of smooth vectors.

=== Reductive group over a local field with closed subgroup ===
When G is a reductive group over a local field and K is a closed subgroup, there are three (possibly non-equivalent) notions of the Gelfand pair appearing in the literature:

(GP1) For any irreducible admissible representation π of G, the dimension of Hom_{K}(π, C) is less than or equal to 1.

(GP2) For any irreducible admissible representation π of G, we have $\dim \operatorname{Hom}_K(\pi, \mathbf{C}) \cdot \dim \operatorname{Hom}_K(\tilde{\pi}, \mathbf{C}) \leq 1$, where $\tilde{\pi}$ denotes the smooth dual.

(GP3) For any irreducible unitary representation π of G on a Hilbert space, the dimension of Hom_{K}(π, C) is less than or equal to 1.

Here, admissible representation is the usual notion of admissible representation when the local field is non-Archimedean. When the local field is Archimedean, admissible representation instead means smooth Fréchet representation of moderate growth such that the corresponding Harish–Chandra module is admissible.

If the local field is Archimedean, then GP3 is the same as the generalized Gelfand property defined in the previous case.

Clearly, GP1 ⇒ GP2 ⇒ GP3.

== Strong Gelfand pairs ==
A pair (G, K) is called a strong Gelfand pair if the pair (G × K, ΔK) is a Gelfand pair, where ΔK ≤ G × K is the diagonal subgroup: $\{(k,k) \in G \times K:k \in K\}$. Sometimes, this property is also called the multiplicity one property.

Each of the above cases can be adapted to strong Gelfand pairs. For example, let G be a finite group. Then the following are equivalent:

- (G, K) is a strong Gelfand pair.
- The algebra of functions on G invariant with respect to conjugation by K (with multiplication defined by convolution) is commutative.
- For any irreducible representations π of G and τ of K, the space Hom_{K}(τ,π) is no more than one-dimensional.
- For any irreducible representations π of G and τ of K, the space Hom_{K}(π,τ) is no more than one-dimensional.

== Criteria for Gelfand property ==
=== Locally compact topological group with compact subgroup ===
In this case, there is a classical criterion due to Gelfand for the pair (G, K) to be Gelfand: Suppose that there exists an involutive anti-automorphism σ of G such that any (K, K) double coset is σ-invariant. Then the pair (G, K) is a Gelfand pair.

This criterion is equivalent to the following one: Suppose that there exists an involutive anti-automorphism σ of G such that any function on G which is invariant with respect to both right and left translations by K is σ-invariant. Then the pair (G, K) is a Gelfand pair.

=== Reductive group over a local field with closed subgroup ===
In this case, there is a criterion due to Gelfand and Kazhdan for the pair (G, K) to satisfy GP2. Suppose that there exists an involutive anti-automorphism σ of G such that any (K, K)-double invariant distribution on G is σ-invariant. Then the pair (G, K) satisfies GP2 (see).

If the above statement holds only for positive definite distributions, then the pair satisfies GP3 (see the next case).

The property GP1 often follows from GP2. For example, this holds if there exists an involutive anti-automorphism of G that preserves K and preserves every closed conjugacy class. For G = GL(n), the transposition can serve as such an involution.

=== Lie group with closed subgroup ===
In this case, there is the following criterion for the pair (G, K) to be a generalized Gelfand pair. Suppose that there exists an involutive anti-automorphism σ of G such that any K × K invariant positive definite distribution on G is σ-invariant. Then the pair (G, K) is a generalized Gelfand pair (see).

=== Criteria for strong Gelfand property ===
All the above criteria can be turned into criteria for strong Gelfand pairs by replacing the two-sided action of K × K by the conjugation action of K.

== Twisted Gelfand pairs ==
A pair (G, K) is called a twisted Gelfand pair with respect to the character χ of the group K, if the Gelfand property holds true when the trivial representation is replaced with the character χ. For example, in the case when K is compact, it means that the dimension of Hom_{K}(π, χ) is less than or equal to 1. The criterion for Gelfand pairs can be adapted to the case of twisted Gelfand pairs.

== Symmetric pairs ==
The Gelfand property is often satisfied by symmetric pairs. A pair (G, K) is called a symmetric pair if there exists an involutive automorphism θ of G such that K is a union of connected components of the group of θ-invariant elements: G^{θ}.

If G is a connected reductive group over R and K = G^{θ} is a compact subgroup, then (G, K) is a Gelfand pair. Example: G = GL(n, R) and K = O(n, R), the subgroup of orthogonal matrices.

In general, it is an interesting question when a symmetric pair of a reductive group over a local field has the Gelfand property. For investigations of symmetric pairs of rank one, see.

An example of high-rank Gelfand symmetric pair is $(\text{GL}(n + k), \text{GL}(n) \times \text{L}(k))$. This was proven in over non-Archimedean local fields and later in for all local fields of characteristic zero.

For more details on this question for high-rank symmetric pairs, see.

== Spherical pairs ==
In the context of algebraic groups, the analogs of Gelfand pairs are called spherical pairs. Namely, a pair (G, K) of algebraic groups is called a spherical pair if one of the following equivalent conditions holds:

- There exists an open (B, K)-double coset in G, where B is the Borel subgroup of G.
- There is a finite number of (B, K)-double coset in G.
- For any algebraic representation π of G, we have $\text{dim} \ \pi^K \leq 1$.

In this case, the space G/H is called spherical space.

It is conjectured that any spherical pair (G, K) over a local field satisfies the following weak version of the Gelfand property: For any admissible representation π of G, the space Hom_{K}(π, C) is finite-dimensional; moreover, the bound for this dimension does not depend on π. This conjecture is proven for a large class of spherical pairs including all the symmetric pairs.

== Applications ==
=== Classification ===
Gelfand pairs are often used for classification of irreducible representations in the following way:

Let (G, K) be a Gelfand pair. An irreducible representation of G is called K-distinguished if Hom_{K}(π, C) is one-dimensional. The representation Ind^{G}_{K}(C) is a model for all K-distinguished representations, that is, any K-distinguished representation appears there with multiplicity exactly 1. A similar notion exists for twisted Gelfand pairs.

Example: If G is a reductive group over a local field and K is its maximal compact subgroup, then K-distinguished representations are called spherical, and such representations can be classified via the Satake correspondence. The notion of spherical representation is in the basis of the notion of Harish-Chandra module.

Example: If G is split reductive group over a local field and K is its maximal unipotent subgroup, then the pair (G, K) is a twisted Gelfand pair with regard to any non-degenerate character ψ (see). In this case, K-distinguished representations are called generic (or non-degenerate) and are easy to classify. Almost any irreducible representation is generic. The unique (up to scalar) imbedding of a generic representation to Ind^{G}_{K}(ψ) is called a Whittaker model.

In the case of G = GL(n) there is a finer version of the result above; namely, there exist a finite sequence of subgroups K_{i} and characters $\psi_i$ such that (G, K_{i}) is a twisted Gelfand pair with regard to $\psi_i$ and any irreducible unitary representation is K_{i} distinguished for exactly one i (see).

=== Gelfand–Zeitlin construction ===
One can also use Gelfand pairs for constructing bases for irreducible representations.

Suppose we have a sequence $\{1\} \subset G_1 \subset \cdots \subset G_n$ such that $(G_i, G_{i-1})$ is a strong Gelfand pair. For simplicity let us assume that G_{n} is compact. Then this gives a canonical decomposition of any irreducible representation of G_{n} to one-dimensional subrepresentations. When G_{n} = U(n) (the unitary group), this construction is called a Gelfand–Zeitlin basis. Since the representations of U(n) are the same as algebraic representations of GL(n), we also obtain a basis of any algebraic irreducible representation of GL(n). However, the constructed basis is not canonical as it depends on the choice of the embeddings $U(i) \subset U(i+1)$.

=== Splitting of periods of automorphic forms ===
A more recent use of Gelfand pairs is for the splitting of periods of automorphic forms.

Let G be a reductive group defined over a global field F and let K be an algebraic subgroup of G. Suppose that for any place $\nu$ of F, the pair (G, K) is a Gelfand pair over the completion $F_\nu$. Let m be an automorphic form over G, then its H-period splits as a product of local factors (i.e. factors that depend only on the behavior of m at each place $\nu$).

Now suppose we are given a family of automorphic forms with a complex parameter s. Then the period of those forms is an analytic function that splits into a product of local factors. Often this means that this function is a certain L-function and this gives an analytic continuation and functional equation for this L-function.

Usually those periods do not converge and one should regularize them.

=== Generalization of representation theory ===
A possible approach to representation theory is to consider the representation theory of a group G as a harmonic analysis on the group G with regard to the two-sided action of G × G. Indeed, to know all the irreducible representations of G is equivalent to know the decomposition of the space of functions on G as a G × G representation. In this approach, representation theory can be generalized by replacing the pair (G × G, G) by any spherical pair (G, K). Then we will be led to the question of harmonic analysis on the space G/K with regard to the action of G.

Now the Gelfand property for the pair (G, K) is an analog of the Schur's lemma.

Using this approach, any concept of representation theory can be generalized to the case of spherical pair. For example, the relative trace formula is obtained from the trace formula by this procedure.

== Examples ==
=== Finite groups ===
A few common examples of Gelfand pairs are:

- $(\text{Sym}(n+1), \text{Sym}(n))$, the symmetric group acting on n+1 points and a point stabilizer that is naturally isomorphic to on n points.
- $(\text{AGL}(n,q), \text{GL}(n,q))$, the affine (general linear) group and a point stabilizer that is naturally isomorphic to the general linear group.

If (G, K) is a Gelfand pair, then (G/N, K/N) is a Gelfand pair for every G-normal subgroup N of K. For many purposes it suffices to consider K without any such non-identity normal subgroups. The action of G on the cosets of K is thus faithful, so one is then looking at permutation groups G with point stabilizers K. To be a Gelfand pair is equivalent to $[1_K,\chi\downarrow^G_K] \leq 1$ for every χ in Irr(G). Since $[1_K,\chi\downarrow^G_K] = [1\uparrow_K^G,\chi]$ by Frobenius reciprocity and $1\uparrow_K^G$ is the character of the permutation action, a permutation group defines a Gelfand pair if and only if the permutation character is a so-called multiplicity-free permutation character. Such multiplicity-free permutation characters were determined for the sporadic groups in (Breuer & Lux 1996).

This gives rise to a class of examples of finite groups with Gelfand pairs: the 2-transitive groups. A permutation group G is 2-transitive if the stabilizer K of a point acts transitively on the remaining points. In particular, G the symmetric group on n+1 points and K the symmetric group on n points forms a Gelfand pair for every n ≥ 1. This follows because the character of a 2-transitive permutation action is of the form 1 + χ for some irreducible character χ and the trivial character 1, (Isaacs 1994, p. 69).

Indeed, if G is a transitive permutation group whose point stabilizer K has at most four orbits (including the trivial orbit containing only the stabilized point), then its Schur ring is commutative and (G, K) is a Gelfand pair, (Wielandt 1964, p. 86). If G is a primitive group of degree twice a prime with point stabilizer K, then again (G, K) is a Gelfand pair, (Wielandt 1964, p. 97).

The Gelfand pairs (Sym(n), K) were classified in (Saxl 1981). Roughly speaking, K must be contained as a subgroup of small index in one of the following groups unless n is smaller than 18:

- Sym(n − k) × Sym(k)
- Sym(n/2) wr Sym(2), Sym(2) wr Sym(n/2) for even n, where wr denotes the wreath product
- Sym(n − 5) × AGL(1, 5)
- Sym(n − 6) × PGL(2, 5)
- Sym(n − 9) × PΓL(2, 8)

Gelfand pairs for classical groups have been investigated as well.

=== Symmetric pairs with compact K ===
- (GL(n, R), O(n, R))
- (GL(n, C), U(n))
- (O(n + k, R), O(n, R) × O(k, R))
- (U(n + k), U(n) × U(k))
- (G, K) where G is a reductive Lie group and K is a maximal compact subgroup

=== Symmetric Gelfand pairs of rank one ===
Let F be a local field of characteristic zero.

- (SL(n + 1, F), GL(n, F)) for n > 5
- (Sp(2n + 2, F), Sp(2n, F)) × Sp(2, F)) for n > 4
- (SO(V ⊕ F), SO(V)) where V is a vector space over F with a non-degenerate quadratic form

=== Symmetric pairs of high rank ===
Let F be a local field of characteristic zero. Let G be a reductive group over F. The following are examples of symmetric Gelfand pairs of high rank:

- (G × G, ΔG), follows from Schur's lemma
- (GL(n + k, F), GL(n, F) × GL(k, F))
- (GL(2n, F), Sp(2n, F))
- (O(n + k, C), O(n, C) × O(k, C))
- (GL(n, C), O(n, C))
- (GL(n, E), GL(n, F)) where E is a quadratic extension of F

=== Strong Gelfand pairs ===
The following pairs are strong Gelfand pairs:

- (Sym(n + 1), Sym(n)), proven using the involutive anti-automorphism g ↦ g^{−1}
- (GL(n + 1, F), GL(n, F)) where F is a local field of characteristic zero
- (O(V ⊕ F), O(V)) where V is a vector space over F with a non-degenerate quadratic form
- U(V ⊕ E), U(V)) where E is a quadratic extension of F and V is a vector space over E with a non-degenerate Hermitian form

Those four examples can be rephrased as the statement that the following are Gelfand pairs:

- (Sym(n + 1) × Sym(n), Δ Sym(n))
- (GL(n + 1, F) × GL(n, F), Δ GL(n, F))
- (O(V ⊕ F) × O(V), Δ O(V))
- (U(V ⊕ E) × U(V), Δ U(V))

== See also ==
- Spherical function

== Works cited ==
- Breuer, T.; Lux, K. (1996), "The multiplicity-free permutation characters of the sporadic simple groups and their automorphism groups", Communications in Algebra, 24 (7): 2293–2316, doi:10.1080/00927879608825701, MR 1390375
- Isaacs, I. Martin (1994), Character Theory of Finite Groups, New York: Dover Publications, ISBN 978-0-486-68014-9, MR 0460423
- Saxl, Jan (1981), "On multiplicity-free permutation representations", Finite geometries and designs (Proc. Conf., Chelwood Gate, 1980), London Math. Soc. Lecture Note Ser., vol. 49, Cambridge University Press, pp. 337–353, MR 0627512
- van Dijk, Gerrit (2009), Introduction to Harmonic Analysis and Generalized Gelfand Pairs, De Gruyter studies in mathematics, vol. 36, Walter de Gruyter, ISBN 978-3-11-022019-3
- Wielandt, Helmut (1964), Finite permutation groups, Boston, MA: Academic Press, MR 0183775
