= Schur–Weyl duality =

Mathematical theorem in representation theory

Schur–Weyl duality is a mathematical theorem in representation theory that relates irreducible finite-dimensional representations of the general linear and symmetric groups. Schur–Weyl duality forms an archetypical situation in representation theory involving two kinds of symmetry that determine each other. It is named after two pioneers of representation theory of Lie groups, Issai Schur, who discovered the phenomenon, and Hermann Weyl, who popularized it in his books on quantum mechanics and classical groups as a way of classifying representations of unitary and general linear groups.

Schur–Weyl duality can be proven using the double centralizer theorem.

== Statement of the theorem ==
Consider the tensor space

$\mathbb{C}^n\otimes\mathbb{C}^n\otimes\cdots\otimes\mathbb{C}^n$ with k factors.

The symmetric group S_{k} on k letters acts on this space (on the left) by permuting the factors,

$$\sigma(v_1\otimes v_2\otimes\cdots\otimes v_k) = v_{\sigma^{-1}(1)}\otimes v_{\sigma^{-1}(2)}\otimes\cdots\otimes v_{\sigma^{-1}(k)}.$$

The general linear group GL_{n} of invertible n×n matrices acts on it by the simultaneous matrix multiplication,

$$g(v_1\otimes v_2\otimes\cdots\otimes v_k) = gv_1\otimes gv_2\otimes\cdots\otimes gv_k, \quad g\in \text{GL}_n.$$

These two actions commute, and in its concrete form, the Schur–Weyl duality asserts that under the joint action of the groups S_{k} and GL_{n}, the tensor space decomposes into a direct sum of tensor products of irreducible modules (for these two groups) that actually determine each other,

$$\mathbb{C}^n\otimes\mathbb{C}^n\otimes\cdots\otimes\mathbb{C}^n = \bigoplus_D \pi_k^D\otimes\rho_n^D.$$

The summands are indexed by the Young diagrams D with k boxes and at most n rows, and representations $\pi_k^D$ of S_{k} with different D are mutually non-isomorphic, and the same is true for representations $\rho_n^D$ of GL_{n}.

The abstract form of the Schur–Weyl duality asserts that two algebras of operators on the tensor space generated by the actions of GL_{n} and S_{k} are the full mutual centralizers in the algebra of the endomorphisms $\mathrm{End}_\mathbb{C}(\mathbb{C}^n\otimes\mathbb{C}^n\otimes\cdots\otimes\mathbb{C}^n).$

== Example ==
Suppose that k = 2 and n is greater than one. Then the Schur–Weyl duality is the statement that the space of two-tensors decomposes into symmetric and antisymmetric parts, each of which is an irreducible module for GL_{n}:

$$\mathbb{C}^n\otimes\mathbb{C}^n = S^2\mathbb{C}^n \oplus \Lambda^2\mathbb{C}^n.$$

The symmetric group S_{2} consists of two elements and has two irreducible representations, the trivial representation and the sign representation. The trivial representation of S_{2} gives rise to the symmetric tensors, which are invariant (i.e. do not change) under the permutation of the factors, and the sign representation corresponds to the skew-symmetric tensors, which flip the sign.

== Proof ==
First consider the following setup:

- G a finite group,
- $A = \mathbb{C}[G]$ the group algebra of G,
- $U$ a finite-dimensional right A-module, and
- $B = \operatorname{End}_G(U)$, which acts on U from the left and commutes with the right action of G (or of A). In other words, $B$ is the centralizer of $A$ in the endomorphism ring $\operatorname{End}_\C(U)$.

The proof uses two algebraic lemmas.

Lemma 1— If $W$ is a simple left A-module, then $U \otimes_A W$ is a simple left B-module.

Proof: Since U is semisimple by Maschke's theorem, there is a decomposition $U = \bigoplus_i U_i^{\oplus m_i}$ into simple A-modules. Then $U \otimes_A W = \bigoplus_i (U_i \otimes_A W)^{\oplus m_i}$. Since A is the left regular representation of G, each simple G-module appears in A and we have that $U_i \otimes_A W = \mathbb{C}$ (respectively zero) if and only if $U_i, W$ correspond to the same simple factor of A (respectively otherwise). Hence, we have: $U \otimes_A W = (U_{i_0} \otimes_A W)^{\oplus m_{i_0}} = \mathbb{C}^{\oplus m_{i_0}}.$ Each nonzero vector in $\mathbb{C}^{\oplus m_{i_0}}$ generates the whole space as a B-module and so $U \otimes_A W$ is simple. (In general, a nonzero module is simple if and only if each of its nonzero cyclic submodule coincides with the module.) $\square$

Lemma 2— When $U = V^{\otimes d}$ and G is the symmetric group $\mathfrak{S}_d$, a subspace of $U$ is a B-submodule if and only if it is invariant under $\operatorname{GL}(V)$; in other words, a B-submodule is the same as a $\operatorname{GL}(V)$-submodule.

Proof: Let $W = \operatorname{End}(V)$. Then $W \hookrightarrow \operatorname{End}(U), w \mapsto w^d = d! w \otimes \cdots \otimes w$. Also, the image of W spans the subspace of symmetric tensors $\operatorname{Sym}^d(W)$. Since $B = \operatorname{Sym}^d(W)$, the image of $W$ spans $B$. Since $\operatorname{GL}(V)$ is dense in W either in the Euclidean topology or in the Zariski topology, the assertion follows. $\square$

The Schur–Weyl duality now follows. We take $G = \mathfrak{S}_d$ to be the symmetric group and $U = V^{\otimes d}$ the d-th tensor power of a finite-dimensional complex vector space V.

Let $V^{\lambda}$ denote the irreducible $\mathfrak{S}_d$-representation corresponding to a partition $\lambda$ and $m_{\lambda} = \dim V^{\lambda}$. Then by Lemma 1

$$S^{\lambda}(V) := V^{\otimes d} \otimes_{\mathfrak{S}_d} V^{\lambda}$$

is irreducible as a $\operatorname{GL}(V)$-module. Moreover, when $A = \bigoplus_{\lambda} (V^{\lambda})^{\oplus m_\lambda}$ is the left semisimple decomposition, we have:

$$V^{\otimes d} = V^{\otimes d} \otimes_A A = \bigoplus_{\lambda} (V^{\otimes d} \otimes_{\mathfrak{S}_d} V^{\lambda})^{\oplus m_{\lambda}}$$,

which is the semisimple decomposition as a $\operatorname{GL}(V)$-module.

== Generalizations ==
The Brauer algebra plays the role of the symmetric group in the generalization of the Schur-Weyl duality to the orthogonal and symplectic groups. The generalization to mixed-tensorial representations of general linear groups involves the Walled-Brauer algebra.

More generally, the partition algebra and its subalgebras give rise to a number of generalizations of the Schur-Weyl duality.

== See also ==
- Partition algebra
