= Quadric geometric algebra =

Quadric geometric algebra (QGA) is a geometrical application of the $\mathcal{G}_{6, 3}$ geometric algebra. This algebra is also known as the $\mathcal{C} \ell_{6, 3}$ Clifford algebra. QGA is a super-algebra over $\mathcal{G}_{4, 1}$ conformal geometric algebra (CGA) and $\mathcal{G}_{1, 3}$ spacetime algebra (STA), which can each be defined within sub-algebras of QGA.

CGA provides representations of spherical entities (points, spheres, planes, and lines) and a complete set of operations (translation, rotation, dilation, and intersection) that apply to them. QGA extends CGA to also include representations of some non-spherical entities: principal axes-aligned quadric surfaces and many of their degenerate forms such as planes, lines, and points.

General quadric surfaces are characterized by the implicit polynomial equation of degree 2

$$A x^2 + B y^2 + C z^2 + D x y + E y z + F z x + G x + H y + I z + J = 0.$$

which can characterize quadric surfaces located at any center point and aligned along arbitrary axes. However, QGA includes vector entities that can represent only the principal axes-aligned quadric surfaces characterized by

$$A x^2 + B y^2 + C z^2 + G x + H y + I z + J = 0.$$

This is still a very significant advancement over CGA.

A possible performance issue with using QGA is the increased computation required to use a 9D vector space, as compared to the smaller 5D vector space of CGA. A 5D CGA subspace can be used when only CGA entities are involved in computations.

In general, the operation of rotation does not work correctly on non-spherical QGA quadric surface entities. Rotation also does not work correctly on the QGA point entities. Attempting to rotate a QGA quadric surface may result in a different type of quadric surface, or a quadric surface that is rotated and distorted in an unexpected way. Attempting to rotate a QGA point may produce a value that projects as the expected rotated vector, but the produced value is generally not a correct embedding of the rotated vector. The failure of QGA points to rotate correctly also leads to the inability to use outermorphisms to rotate dual Geometric Outer Product Null Space (GOPNS) entities. To rotate a QGA point, it must be projected to a vector or converted to a CGA point for rotation operations, then the rotated result can be re-embedded or converted back into a QGA point. A quadric surface rotated by an arbitrary angle cannot be represented by any known QGA entity. Representation of general quadric surfaces with useful operations will require an algebra (that appears to be unknown at this time) that extends QGA.

Although rotation is generally unavailable in QGA, the transposition operation is a special-case modification of rotation by $\pi / 2$ that works correctly on all QGA GIPNS entities. Transpositions allow QGA GIPNS entities to be reflected in the six diagonal planes $y = \pm x$, $z = \pm x$, and $z = \pm y$.

Entities for all principal axes-aligned quadric surfaces can be defined in QGA. These include ellipsoids, cylinders, cones, paraboloids, and hyperboloids in all of their various forms.

A powerful feature of QGA is the ability to compute the intersections of axes-aligned quadric surfaces. With few exceptions, the outer product of QGA GIPNS surface entities represents their surfaces intersection(s). This method of computing intersections works the same as it does in CGA, where only spherical entities are available.
