= Erich Hecke =

German mathematician

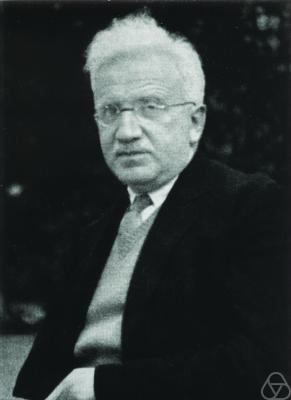
- Erich Hecke, date unknown
- Born: 20 September 1887; Buk, Province of Posen, German Empire
- Died: 13 February 1947 (aged 59); Copenhagen, Denmark
- Education: University of Göttingen
- Known for: Hecke algebra Hecke operator
- Awards: Ackermann–Teubner Memorial Award (1938)
- Scientific career
- Fields: Mathematics
- Workplaces: University of Basel; University of Göttingen; University of Hamburg
- Doctoral advisor: David Hilbert
- Notable students: Kurt Reidemeister; Heinrich Behnke; Hans Petersson

Erich Hecke (German: [ˈhɛkə]; 20 September 1887 – 13 February 1947) was a German mathematician known for his work in number theory and the theory of modular forms.

== Biography ==
Hecke was born in Buk, Province of Posen, German Empire (now Poznań, Poland). He obtained his doctorate in Göttingen under the supervision of David Hilbert.

Kurt Reidemeister and Heinrich Behnke were among his students.

In 1933 Hecke signed the Loyalty Oath of German Professors to Adolf Hitler and the National Socialist State, but was later known as being opposed to the Nazis.

Hecke died in Copenhagen, Denmark.

André Weil, in the foreword to his text Basic Number Theory says: "To improve upon Hecke, in a treatment along classical lines of the theory of algebraic numbers, would be a futile and impossible task", referring to Hecke's book Lectures on the Theory of Algebraic Numbers.

== Research ==
His early work included establishing the functional equation for the Dedekind zeta function, with a proof based on theta functions. The method extended to the L-functions associated to a class of characters now known as Hecke characters or idele class characters; such L-functions are now known as Hecke L-functions. He devoted most of his research to the theory of modular forms, creating the general theory of cusp forms (holomorphic, for GL(2)), as it is now understood in the classical setting.

== Recognition ==
He was a Plenary Speaker of the ICM in 1936 in Oslo.

== See also ==
- List of things named after Erich Hecke
- Hecke algebra (disambiguation)
- Tate's thesis
