= Hecke algebra of a finite group =

The Hecke algebra of a finite group is the algebra spanned by the double cosets HgH of a subgroup H of a finite group G. It is a special case of a Hecke algebra of a locally compact group.

== Definition ==
Let F be a field of characteristic zero, G a finite group and H a subgroup of G. Let $F[G]$ denote the group algebra of G: the space of F-valued functions on G with the multiplication given by convolution. We write $F[G/H]$ for the space of F-valued functions on $G/H$. An (F-valued) function on G/H determines and is determined by a function on G that is invariant under the right action of H. That is, there is the natural identification:

$$F[G/H] = F[G]^H.$$

Similarly, there is the identification

$$R := \operatorname{End}_G(F[G/H]) = F[G]^{H \times H}$$

given by sending a G-linear map f to the value of f evaluated at the characteristic function of H. For each double coset $HgH$, let $T_g$ denote the characteristic function of it. Then those $T_g$'s form a basis of R.

== Application in representation theory ==
Let $\varphi : G \rightarrow GL(V)$ be any finite-dimensional complex representation of a finite group G, the Hecke algebra $H = \operatorname{End}_G(V)$ is the algebra of G-equivariant endomorphisms of V. For each irreducible representation $W$ of G, the action of H on V preserves $\tilde{W}$ – the isotypic component of $W$ – and commutes with $W$ as a G action.

== See also ==
- Gelfand pair
