= Absolute irreducibility =

In mathematics, a multivariate polynomial defined over the rational numbers is absolutely irreducible if it is irreducible over the complex field. For example, $x^2+y^2-1$ is absolutely irreducible, but while $x^2+y^2$ is irreducible over the integers and the reals, it is reducible over the complex numbers as $x^2+y^2 = (x+iy)(x-iy),$ and thus not absolutely irreducible.

More generally, a polynomial defined over a field K is absolutely irreducible if it is irreducible over every algebraic extension of K, and an affine algebraic set defined by equations with coefficients in a field K is absolutely irreducible if it is not the union of two algebraic sets defined by equations in an algebraically closed extension of K. In other words, an absolutely irreducible algebraic set is a synonym of an algebraic variety, which emphasizes that the coefficients of the defining equations may not belong to an algebraically closed field.

Absolutely irreducible is also applied, with the same meaning, to linear representations of algebraic groups.

In all cases, being absolutely irreducible is the same as being irreducible over the algebraic closure of the ground field.

== Examples ==
- A univariate polynomial of degree greater than or equal to 2 is never absolutely irreducible, due to the fundamental theorem of algebra.
- The irreducible two-dimensional representation of the symmetric group S_{3} of order 6, originally defined over the field of rational numbers, is absolutely irreducible.
- The representation of the circle group by rotations in the plane is irreducible (over the field of real numbers), but is not absolutely irreducible. After extending the field to complex numbers, it splits into two irreducible components. This is to be expected, since the circle group is commutative and it is known that all irreducible representations of commutative groups over an algebraically closed field are one-dimensional.
- The real algebraic variety defined by the equation

$$x^2 + y^2 = 1$$

is absolutely irreducible. It is the ordinary circle over the reals and remains an irreducible conic section over the field of complex numbers. Absolute irreducibility more generally holds over any field not of characteristic two. In characteristic two, the equation is equivalent to (x + y −1)^{2} = 0. Hence it defines the double line x + y =1, which is a non-reduced scheme.

- The algebraic variety given by the equation

$$x^2 + y^2 = 0$$

is not absolutely irreducible. Indeed, the left hand side can be factored as

$x^2 + y^2 = (x+yi)(x-yi),$ where $i$ is a square root of −1.

Therefore, this algebraic variety consists of two lines intersecting at the origin and is not absolutely irreducible. This holds either already over the ground field, if −1 is a square, or over the quadratic extension obtained by adjoining i.
