= Hecke algebra =

Type of vector space

In mathematics, the Hecke algebra is the algebra generated by Hecke operators, which are named after Erich Hecke.

== Properties ==
The algebra is a commutative ring.

In the classical elliptic modular form theory, the Hecke operators T_{n} with n coprime to the level acting on the space of cusp forms of a given weight are self-adjoint with respect to the Petersson inner product. Therefore, the spectral theorem implies that there is a basis of modular forms that are eigenfunctions for these Hecke operators. Each of these basic forms possesses an Euler product. More precisely, its Mellin transform is the Dirichlet series that has Euler products with the local factor for each prime p is the reciprocal of the Hecke polynomial, a quadratic polynomial in p^{−s}. In the case treated by Mordell, the space of cusp forms of weight 12 with respect to the full modular group is one-dimensional. It follows that the Ramanujan form has an Euler product and establishes the multiplicativity of τ(n).

== Generalizations ==
The classical Hecke algebra has been generalized to other settings, such as the Hecke algebra of a locally compact group and spherical Hecke algebra that arise when modular forms and other automorphic forms are viewed using adelic groups. These play a central role in the Langlands correspondence.

The derived Hecke algebra is a further generalization of Hecke algebras to derived functors. It was introduced by Peter Schneider in 2015 who, together with Rachel Ollivier, used them to study the p-adic Langlands correspondence. It is the subject of several conjectures on the cohomology of arithmetic groups by Akshay Venkatesh and his collaborators.

== See also ==
- Abstract algebra
- Wiles's proof of Fermat's Last Theorem
