= Iwahori–Hecke algebra =

Deformation of the group algebra of a Coxeter group

In mathematics, the Iwahori–Hecke algebra, or Hecke algebra, named for Erich Hecke and Nagayoshi Iwahori, is a deformation of the group algebra of a Coxeter group. The Hecke algebra can also be viewed as a q-analog of the group algebra of a Coxeter group.

Hecke algebras are quotients of the group rings of Artin braid groups. This connection found a spectacular application in Vaughan Jones' construction of new invariants of knots. Representations of Hecke algebras led to discovery of quantum groups by Michio Jimbo. Michael Freedman proposed Hecke algebras as a foundation for topological quantum computation.

== Hecke algebras of Coxeter groups ==
Start with the following data:

- (W, S) is a Coxeter system with the Coxeter matrix M = (m_{st}),
- R is a commutative ring with identity,
- {q_{s} | s ∈ S} is a family of units of R such that q_{s} = q_{t} whenever s and t are conjugate in W, and
- A is the ring of Laurent polynomials over R with indeterminates q_{s} (and the above restriction that q_{s} = q_{t} whenever s and t are conjugate), that is, A = R[q^{±1}_{s}].

=== Multiparameter Hecke algebras ===
The multiparameter Hecke algebra H_{R}(W, S, q) is a unital, associative R-algebra with generators T_{s} for all s ∈ S that satisfy the following relations:

- Braid Relations: for each pair s, t in S for which m_{st} < ∞ factors, a relation T_{s} T_{t} T_{s} ... = T_{t} T_{s} T_{t} ..., where each side has m_{st} factors; and
- Quadratic Relation: for all s in S, a relation (T_{s} − q_{s})(T_{s} + 1) = 0.

Warning: in later books and papers, Lusztig used a modified form of the quadratic relation that reads $(T_s-q_s^{1/2})(T_s+q_s^{-1/2})=0.$ After extending the scalars to include the half-integer powers q^{±1/2}_{s} the resulting Hecke algebra is isomorphic to the previously defined one (but the T_{s} here corresponds to q^{−1/2}_{s} T_{s} in our notation). While this does not change the general theory, many formulae look different.

=== Generic multiparameter Hecke algebras ===
The algebra H_{A}(W, S, q) is the generic multiparameter Hecke algebra. This algebra is universal in the sense that every other multiparameter Hecke algebra can be obtained from it via the (unique) ring homomorphism A → R which maps the indeterminate q_{s} ∈ A to the unit q_{s} ∈ R. This homomorphism turns R into a A-algebra and the scalar extension H_{A}(W, S) ⊗_{A} R is canonically isomorphic to the Hecke algebra H_{R}(W, S, q) as constructed above. One calls this process specialization of the generic algebra.

=== One-parameter Hecke algebras ===
If one specializes every indeterminate q_{s} to a single indeterminate q over the integers (or q^{1/2}_{s} to q^{1/2}, respectively), then one obtains the so-called generic one-parameter Hecke algebra of (W, S).

Since in Coxeter groups with single laced Dynkin diagrams (for example Coxeter groups of type A and D) every pair of Coxeter generators is conjugated, the above-mentioned restriction of q_{s} being equal q_{t} whenever s and t are conjugated in W forces the multiparameter and the one-parameter Hecke algebras to be equal. Therefore, it is also very common to only look at one-parameter Hecke algebras.

=== Coxeter groups with weights ===
If an integral weight function is defined on W (i.e., a map L: W → Z with L(vw) = L(v) + L(w) for all v, w ∈ W with l(vw) = l(v) + l(w)), then a common specialization to look at is the one induced by the homomorphism q_{s} ↦ q^{L(s)}, where q is a single indeterminate over Z.

If one uses the convention with half-integer powers, then weight function L: W → 1/2Z may be permitted as well. For technical reasons it is also often convenient only to consider positive weight functions.

== Properties ==
1. The Hecke algebra has a basis $(T_w)_{w\in W}$ over A indexed by the elements of the Coxeter group W. In particular, H is a free A-module. If $w=s_1 s_2 \ldots s_n$ is a reduced decomposition of w ∈ W, then $T_w = T_{s_1}T_{s_2}\ldots T_{s_n}$. This basis of Hecke algebra is sometimes called the natural basis. The neutral element of W corresponds to the identity of H: T_{e} = 1.

2. The elements of the natural basis are multiplicative, namely, T_{yw} = T_{y} T_{w} whenever l(yw) = l(y) + l(w), where l denotes the length function on the Coxeter group W.

3. Elements of the natural basis are invertible. For example, from the quadratic relation we conclude that T^{−1}_{s} = q^{−1}_{s} T_{s} + (q^{−1}_{s}−1).

4. Suppose that W is a finite group and the ground ring is the field C of complex numbers. Jacques Tits proved that if the indeterminate q is specialized to any complex number outside of an explicitly given list (consisting of roots of unity), then the resulting one-parameter Hecke algebra is semisimple and isomorphic to the complex group algebra C[W] (which also corresponds to the specialization q ↦ 1).

5. More generally, if W is a finite group and the ground ring R is a field of characteristic zero, then the one-parameter Hecke algebra is a semisimple associative algebra over R[q^{±1}]. Moreover, extending earlier results of Benson and Curtis, George Lusztig provided an explicit isomorphism between the Hecke algebra and the group algebra after the extension of scalars to the quotient field of R[q^{±1/2}]

== Canonical basis ==
A great discovery of Kazhdan and Lusztig was that a Hecke algebra admits a different basis, which in a way controls representation theory of a variety of related objects.

The generic multiparameter Hecke algebra, H_{A}(W, S, q), has an involution bar that maps q^{1/2} to q^{−1/2} and acts as identity on Z. Then H admits a unique ring automorphism i that is semilinear with respect to the bar involution of A and maps T_{s} to T^{−1}_{s}. It can further be proved that this automorphism is involutive (has order two) and takes any T_{w} to $T^{-1}_{w^{-1}}.$

Kazhdan - Lusztig Theorem: For each w ∈ W there exists a unique element $C^{\prime}_w$ which is invariant under the involution i and if one writes its expansion in terms of the natural basis:

$$C'_w = \left (q^{-1/2} \right )^{l(w)}\sum_{y\leq w}P_{y,w}T_y,$$

one has the following:

- P_{w,w} = 1,
- P_{y,w} in Z[q] has degree less than or equal to 1/2(l(w) − l(y) − 1) if y < w in the Bruhat order,
- P_{y,w}=0 if $y\nleq w.$

The elements $C^{\prime}_w$ where w varies over W form a basis of the algebra H, which is called the dual canonical basis of the Hecke algebra H. The canonical basis {C_{w} | w ∈ W} is obtained in a similar way. The polynomials P_{y,w}(q) making appearance in this theorem are the Kazhdan–Lusztig polynomials.

The Kazhdan–Lusztig notions of left, right and two-sided cells in Coxeter groups are defined through the behavior of the canonical basis under the action of H.

== Hecke algebra of a locally compact group ==
Iwahori–Hecke algebras first appeared as an important special case of a very general construction in group theory. Let (G, K) be a pair consisting of a unimodular locally compact topological group G and a closed subgroup K of G. Then the space of K-biinvariant continuous functions of compact support, C_{c}(K\G/K), can be endowed with a structure of an associative algebra under the operation of convolution. This algebra is denoted by H(G//K) and called the Hecke ring of the pair (G, K).

Example: If G = SL(n, Q_{p}) and K = SL(n, Z_{p}) then the Hecke ring is commutative and its representations were studied by Ian G. Macdonald. More generally if (G, K) is a Gelfand pair then the resulting algebra turns out to be commutative.

Example: If G = SL(2, Q) and K = SL(2, Z) we get the abstract ring behind Hecke operators in the theory of modular forms, which gave the name to Hecke algebras in general.

The case leading to the Hecke algebra of a finite Weyl group is when G is the finite Chevalley group over a finite field with p^{k} elements, and B is its Borel subgroup. Iwahori showed that the Hecke ring H(G//B) is obtained from the generic Hecke algebra H_{q} of the Weyl group W of G by specializing the indeterminate q of the latter algebra to p^{k}, the cardinality of the finite field. George Lusztig remarked in 1984 (Characters of reductive groups over a finite field, xi, footnote):

I think it would be most appropriate to call it the Iwahori algebra, but the name Hecke ring (or algebra) given by Iwahori himself has been in use for almost 20 years and it is probably too late to change it now.

Iwahori and Matsumoto (1965) considered the case when G is a group of points of a reductive algebraic group over a non-archimedean local field K, such as Q_{p}, and K is what is now called an Iwahori subgroup of G. The resulting Hecke ring is isomorphic to the Hecke algebra of the affine Weyl group of G, or the affine Hecke algebra, where the indeterminate q has been specialized to the cardinality of the residue field of K.

Work of Roger Howe in the 1970s and his papers with Allen Moy on representations of p-adic GL(n) opened a possibility of classifying irreducible admissible representations of reductive groups over local fields in terms of appropriately constructed Hecke algebras. (Important contributions were also made by Joseph Bernstein and Andrey Zelevinsky.) These ideas were taken much further in Colin Bushnell and Philip Kutzko's theory of types, allowing them to complete the classification in the general linear case. Many of the techniques can be extended to other reductive groups, which remains an area of active research. It has been conjectured that all Hecke algebras that are ever needed are mild generalizations of affine Hecke algebras.

== Representations of Hecke algebras ==
It follows from Iwahori's work that complex representations of Hecke algebras of finite type are intimately related with the structure of the spherical principal series representations of finite Chevalley groups.

George Lusztig pushed this connection much further and was able to describe most of the characters of finite groups of Lie type in terms of representation theory of Hecke algebras. This work used a mixture of geometric techniques and various reductions, led to introduction of various objects generalizing Hecke algebras and detailed understanding of their representations (for q not a root of unity). Modular representations of Hecke algebras and representations at roots of unity turned out to be related with the theory of canonical bases in affine quantum groups and combinatorics.

Representation theory of affine Hecke algebras was developed by Lusztig with a view towards applying it to description of representations of p-adic groups. It is different in many ways from the finite case. A generalization of affine Hecke algebras, called double affine Hecke algebra, was used by Ivan Cherednik in his proof of the Macdonald's constant term conjecture.
