= Semisimple algebra =

Associative Artinian algebra with a trivial Jacobson radical

In ring theory, a branch of mathematics, a semisimple algebra is an associative Artinian algebra over a field which has trivial Jacobson radical (only the zero element of the algebra is in the Jacobson radical). If the algebra is finite-dimensional this is equivalent to saying that it can be expressed as a Cartesian product of simple subalgebras.

== Definition ==
The Jacobson radical of an algebra over a field is the ideal consisting of all elements that annihilate every simple left-module. The radical contains all nilpotent ideals, and if the algebra is finite-dimensional, the radical itself is a nilpotent ideal. A finite-dimensional algebra is then said to be semisimple if its radical contains only the zero element.

An algebra $A$ is called simple if it has no proper ideals and $A^2=\{ab|a,b\in A\}\ne\{0\}$. As the terminology suggests, simple algebras are semisimple. The only possible ideals of a simple algebra $A$ are $A$ and $\{0\}$. Thus if $A$ is simple, then $A$ is not nilpotent. Because $A^2$ is an ideal of $A$ and $A$ is simple, $A^2=A$. By induction, $A^n=A$ for every positive integer $n$, i.e. $A$ is not nilpotent.

Any self-adjoint subalgebra $A$ of $n\times n$ matrices with complex entries is semisimple. Let $\operatorname{Rad}(A)$ be the radical of $A$. Suppose a matrix $M$ is in $\operatorname{Rad}(A)$. Then $M^*M$ lies in some nilpotent ideals of $A$, therefore $(M^*M)^k=0$ for some positive integer $k$. By positive-semidefiniteness of $M^*M$, this implies $M^*M=0$. So $Mx$ is the zero vector for all $x$, i.e. $M=0$.

If ${A_i}$ is a finite collection of simple algebras, then their Cartesian product $A=\prod A_i$ is semisimple. If $(A_i)$ is an element of $\operatorname{Rad}(A)$ and $e_1$ is the multiplicative identity in $A_1$ (all simple algebras possess a multiplicative identity), then $(a_1,a_2,\dots)\cdot(e_1,0,\dots)=(a_1,0,\dots)$ lies in some nilpotent ideal of $\prod A_i$. This implies, for all $b$ in $A_1$, $a_1b$ is nilpotent in $A_1$, i.e. $a_1\in\operatorname{Rad}(A_1)$. So $a_1=0$. Similarly, $a_i=0$ for all other $i$.

It is less apparent from the definition that the converse of the above is also true, that is, any finite-dimensional semisimple algebra is isomorphic to a Cartesian product of a finite number of simple algebras.

== Characterization ==
Let $A$ be a finite-dimensional semisimple algebra, and

$$\{0\} = J_0 \subset \cdots \subset J_n \subset A$$

be a composition series of $A$ then $A$ is isomorphic to the following Cartesian product:

$$A \simeq J_1 \times J_2/J_1 \times J_3/J_2 \times ... \times J_n/ J_{n-1} \times A / J_n$$

where each

$$J_{i+1}/J_i \,$$

is a simple algebra.

The proof can be sketched as follows. First, invoking the assumption that $A$ is semisimple, one can show that the $J_1$ is a simple algebra (therefore unital). So $J_1$ is a unital subalgebra and an ideal of $J_2$. Therefore, one can decompose

$$J_2 \simeq J_1 \times J_2/J_1 .$$

By maximality of $J_1$ as an ideal in $J_2$ and also the semisimplicity of $A$ the algebra

$$J_2/J_1 \,$$

is simple. Proceed by induction in similar fashion proves the claim. For example, $J_3$ is the Cartesian product of simple algebras

$$J_3 \simeq J_2 \times J_3 / J_2 \simeq J_1 \times J_2/J_1 \times J_3 / J_2.$$

The above result can be restated in a different way. For a semisimple algebra $A=A_1\times\cdots\times A_n$ expressed in terms of its simple factors, consider the units $e_i\in A_i$. The elements $E_i=(0,\dots,e_i,\dots,0)$ are idempotent elements in $A$ and they lie in the center of $A$ Furthermore, $E_i A=A_i,E_iE_j=0$ for $i \ne j$, and $\sum E_i=1$, the multiplicative identity in $A$.

Therefore, for every semisimple algebra $A$, there exists idempotents $\{E_i\}$ in the center of $A$, such that

1. $E_iE_j=0$ for $i\ne j$ (such a set of idempotents is called central orthogonal),
2. $\sum E_i=1$,
3. $A$ is isomorphic to the Cartesian product of simple algebras $E_1A\times\dots\times E_nA$.

== Classification ==
A theorem due to Joseph Wedderburn completely classifies finite-dimensional semisimple algebras over a field $k$. Any such algebra is isomorphic to a finite product $\prod M_{n_i}(D_i)$ where the $n_i$ are natural numbers, the $D_i$ are division algebras over $k$, and $M_{n_i}(D_i)$ is the algebra of $n_i \times n_i$ matrices over $D_i$. This product is unique up to permutation of the factors.

This theorem was later generalized by Emil Artin to semisimple rings. This more general result is called the Wedderburn–Artin theorem.
