= Discrete series representation =

Type of group representation for locally compact groups

In mathematics, a discrete series representation is an irreducible unitary representation of a locally compact topological group G that is a subrepresentation of the left regular representation of G on L²(G). In the Plancherel measure, such representations have positive measure. The name comes from the fact that they are exactly the representations that occur discretely in the decomposition of the regular representation.

== Properties ==
If G is unimodular, an irreducible unitary representation ρ of G is in the discrete series if and only if one (and hence all) matrix coefficient

$$\langle \rho(g)\cdot v, w \rangle \,$$

with v, w non-zero vectors is square-integrable on G, with respect to Haar measure.

When G is unimodular, the discrete series representation has a formal dimension d, with the property that

$$d\int \langle \rho(g)\cdot v, w \rangle \overline{\langle \rho(g)\cdot x, y \rangle}dg =\langle  v, x \rangle\overline{\langle  w, y \rangle}$$

for v, w, x, y in the representation. When G is compact this coincides with the dimension when the Haar measure on G is normalized so that G has measure 1.

== Semisimple groups ==
Harish-Chandra (1965, 1966) classified the discrete series representations of connected semisimple groups G. In particular, such a group has discrete series representations if and only if it has the same rank as a maximal compact subgroup K. In other words, a maximal torus T in K must be a Cartan subgroup in G. (This result required that the center of G be finite, ruling out groups such as the simply connected cover of SL(2,R).) It applies in particular to special linear groups; of these only SL(2,R) has a discrete series (for this, see the representation theory of SL(2,R)).

Harish-Chandra's classification of the discrete series representations of a semisimple connected Lie group is given as follows. If L is the weight lattice of the maximal torus T, a sublattice of it where t is the Lie algebra of T, then there is a discrete series representation for every vector v of

L + ρ,

where ρ is the Weyl vector of G, that is not orthogonal to any root of G. Every discrete series representation occurs in this way. Two such vectors v correspond to the same discrete series representation if and only if they are conjugate under the Weyl group W_{K} of the maximal compact subgroup K. If we fix a fundamental chamber for the Weyl group of K, then the discrete series representation are in 1:1 correspondence with the vectors of L + ρ in this Weyl chamber that are not orthogonal to any root of G. The infinitesimal character of the highest weight representation is given by v (mod the Weyl group W_{G} of G) under the Harish-Chandra correspondence identifying infinitesimal characters of G with points of

t ⊗ C/W_{G}.

So for each discrete series representation, there are exactly

|W_{G}|/|W_{K}|

discrete series representations with the same infinitesimal character.

Harish-Chandra went on to prove an analogue for these representations of the Weyl character formula. In the case where G is not compact, the representations have infinite dimension, and the notion of character is therefore more subtle to define since it is a Schwartz distribution (represented by a locally integrable function), with singularities.

The character is given on the maximal torus T by

$$(-1)^{\frac{\dim(G)-\dim(K)}{2}} {\sum_{w\in W_K}\det(w)e^{w(v)}\over \prod_{(v,\alpha)>0} \left (e^{\frac{\alpha}{2}}-e^{-\frac{\alpha}{2}} \right )}$$

When G is compact this reduces to the Weyl character formula, with v = λ + ρ for λ the highest weight of the irreducible representation (where the product is over roots α having positive inner product with the vector v).

Harish-Chandra's regularity theorem implies that the character of a discrete series representation is a locally integrable function on the group.

== Limit of discrete series representations ==
Points v in the coset L + ρ orthogonal to roots of G do not correspond to discrete series representations, but those not orthogonal to roots of K are related to certain irreducible representations called limit of discrete series representations. There is such a representation for every pair (v,C) where v is a vector of L + ρ orthogonal to some root of G but not orthogonal to any root of K corresponding to a wall of C, and C is a Weyl chamber of G containing v. (In the case of discrete series representations there is only one Weyl chamber containing v so it is not necessary to include it explicitly.) Two pairs (v,C) give the same limit of discrete series representation if and only if they are conjugate under the Weyl group of K. Just as for discrete series representations v gives the infinitesimal character. There are at most |W_{G}|/|W_{K}| limit of discrete series representations with any given infinitesimal character.

Limit of discrete series representations are tempered representations, which means roughly that they only just fail to be discrete series representations.

== Constructions of the discrete series ==
Harish-Chandra's original construction of the discrete series was not very explicit. Several authors later found more explicit realizations of the discrete series.

- Narasimhan & Okamoto (1970) constructed most of the discrete series representations in the case when the symmetric space of G is hermitian.
- Parthasarathy (1972) constructed many of the discrete series representations for arbitrary G.
- Langlands (1966) conjectured, and Schmid (1976) proved, a geometric analogue of the Borel–Bott–Weil theorem, for the discrete series, using L^{2} cohomology instead of the coherent sheaf cohomology used in the compact case.
- An application of the index theorem, Atiyah & Schmid (1977) constructed all the discrete series representations in spaces of harmonic spinors. Unlike most of the previous constructions of representations, the work of Atiyah and Schmid did not use Harish-Chandra's existence results in their proofs.
- Discrete series representations can also be constructed by cohomological parabolic induction using Zuckerman functors.

== See also ==
- Blattner's conjecture
- Holomorphic discrete series representation
- Quaternionic discrete series representation
