= Harish-Chandra theorem =

In mathematics, Harish-Chandra theorem may refer to one of several theorems due to Harish-Chandra, including:

- Harish-Chandra's theorem on the Harish-Chandra isomorphism
- Harish-Chandra's classification of discrete series representations
- Harish-Chandra's regularity theorem
