= Tempered representation =

Type of representation of a linear semisimple Lie group

In mathematics, a tempered representation of a linear semisimple Lie group is a representation that has a basis whose matrix coefficients lie in the L^{p} space

L^{2+ε}(G)

for any ε > 0.

== Formulation ==
This condition, as just given, is slightly weaker than the condition that the matrix coefficients are square-integrable, in other words lie in

L^{2}(G),

which would be the definition of a discrete series representation. If G is a linear semisimple Lie group with a maximal compact subgroup K, an admissible representation ρ of G is tempered if the above condition holds for the K-finite matrix coefficients of ρ.

The definition above is also used for more general groups, such as p-adic Lie groups and finite central extensions of semisimple real algebraic groups. The definition of "tempered representation" makes sense for arbitrary unimodular locally compact groups, but on groups with infinite centers such as infinite central extensions of semisimple Lie groups it does not behave well and is usually replaced by a slightly different definition. More precisely, an irreducible representation is called tempered if it is unitary when restricted to the center Z, and the absolute values of the matrix coefficients are in L^{2+ε}(G/Z).

Tempered representations on semisimple Lie groups were first defined and studied by Harish-Chandra (using a different but equivalent definition), who showed that they are exactly the representations needed for the Plancherel theorem. They were classified by Knapp and Zuckerman, and used by Langlands in the Langlands classification of irreducible representations of a reductive Lie group G in terms of the tempered representations of smaller groups.

== History ==
Irreducible tempered representations were identified by Harish-Chandra in his work on harmonic analysis on a semisimple Lie group as those representations that contribute to the Plancherel measure. The original definition of a tempered representation, which has certain technical advantages, is that its Harish-Chandra character should be a "tempered distribution" (see the section about this below). It follows from Harish-Chandra's results that it is equivalent to the more elementary definition given above. Tempered representations also seem to play a fundamental role in the theory of automorphic forms. This connection was probably first realized by Satake (in the context of the Ramanujan-Petersson conjecture) and Robert Langlands and served as a motivation for Langlands to develop his classification scheme for irreducible admissible representations of real and p-adic reductive algebraic groups in terms of the tempered representations of smaller groups. The precise conjectures identifying the place of tempered representations in the automorphic spectrum were formulated later by James Arthur and constitute one of the most actively developing parts of the modern theory of automorphic forms.

== Harmonic analysis ==
Tempered representations play an important role in the harmonic analysis on semisimple Lie groups. An irreducible unitary representation of a semisimple Lie group G is tempered if and only if it is in the support of the Plancherel measure of G. In other words, tempered representations are precisely the class of representations of G appearing in the spectral decomposition of L^{2} functions on the group (while discrete series representations have a stronger property that an individual representation has a positive spectral measure). This stands in contrast with the situation for abelian and more general solvable Lie groups, where a different class of representations is needed to fully account for the spectral decomposition. This can be seen already in the simplest example of the additive group R of the real numbers, for which the matrix elements of the irreducible representations do not fall off to 0 at infinity.

In the Langlands program, tempered representations of real Lie groups are those coming from unitary characters of tori by Langlands functoriality.

== Examples ==
- The Plancherel theorem for a semisimple Lie group involves representations that are not the discrete series. This becomes clear already in the case of the group SL_{2}(R). The principal series representations of SL_{2}(R) are tempered and account for the spectral decomposition of functions supported on the hyperbolic elements of the group. However, they do not occur discretely in the regular representation of SL_{2}(R).
- The two limit of discrete series representations of SL_{2}(R) are tempered but not discrete series (even though they occur "discretely" in the list of irreducible unitary representations).
- For non-semisimple Lie groups, representations with matrix coefficients in L^{2+ε} do not always suffice for the Plancherel theorem, as shown by the example of the additive group R of real numbers and the Fourier integral; in fact, all irreducible unitary representations of R contribute to the Plancherel measure, but none of them have matrix coefficients in L^{2+ε}.
- The complementary series representations of SL_{2}(R) are irreducible unitary representations that are not tempered.
- The trivial representation of a group G is an irreducible unitary representation that is not tempered unless G is compact.

== Classification ==
The irreducible tempered representations of a semisimple Lie group were classified by Knapp and Zuckerman (1976, 1982). In fact they classified a more general class of representations called basic representations. If P=MAN is the Langlands decomposition of a cuspidal parabolic subgroup, then a basic representation is defined to be the parabolically induced representation associated to a limit of discrete series representation of M and a unitary representation of the abelian group A. If the limit of discrete series representation is in fact a discrete series representation, then the basic representation is called an induced discrete series representation. Any irreducible tempered representation is a basic representation, and conversely any basic representation is the sum of a finite number of irreducible tempered representations. More precisely, it is a direct sum of 2^{r} irreducible tempered representations indexed by the characters of an elementary abelian group R of order 2^{r} (called the R-group). Any basic representation, and consequently any irreducible tempered representation, is a summand of an induced discrete series representation. However it is not always possible to represent an irreducible tempered representation as an induced discrete series representation, which is why one considers the more general class of basic representations.

So the irreducible tempered representations are just the irreducible basic representations, and can be classified by listing all basic representations and picking out those that are irreducible, in other words those that have trivial R-group.

== Tempered distributions ==
Fix a semisimple Lie group G with maximal compact subgroup K. Harish-Chandra (1966, section 9) defined a distribution on G to be tempered if it is defined on the Schwartz space of G. The Schwartz space is in turn defined to be the space of smooth functions f on G such that for any real r and any function g obtained from f by acting on the left or right by elements of the universal enveloping algebra of the Lie algebra of G, the function

$$(1+\sigma)^rg/\Xi$$

is bounded. Here Ξ is a certain spherical function on G, invariant under left and right multiplication by K, and σ is the norm of the log of p, where an element g of G is written as : g=kp for k in K and p in P.
