= Harish-Chandra's function =

In mathematics, Harish-Chandra's function may refer to:

- Harish-Chandra's c-function
- Harish-Chandra's σ function
- Harish-Chandra's Ξ function
