= Jantzen (disambiguation) =

Jantzen is a clothing company based in Portland, Oregon, United States.

Jantzen may also refer to:

== People with surname Jantzen ==
- Alice C. Jantzen (1918–1983), American occupational therapist
- Christian Jantzen (born 1977), Australian sports journalist
- Grace Jantzen (1948–2006), British philosopher and theologian
- Heinie Jantzen (1890–1948), American Major League Baseball player
- Hermann Jantzen (1866–1959), Mennonite missionary to Russian Turkestan
- Jens Carsten Jantzen (born 1948), German mathematician
- Jesse Jantzen, American wrestler
- Robert A. Jantzen, Director of the United States Fish and Wildlife Service from 1981 to 1986

== Other ==
- Jantzen & Thormählen, a defunct German company that operated in Cameroon
- Jantzen Beach, a former amusement park in Portland, Oregon, U.S., and later the site of a shopping center
- Jantzen Knitting Mills Company Building, in Portland, Oregon, listed on the U.S. National Register of Historic Places
- Jantzen filtration, a mathematical filtration
- Stephan Jantzen, an icebreaker
- The Italian ship MV Sebastiano Veniero originally sailed as the Dutch ship Jason and was referred to in some German records as the Jantzen
