= Schur orthogonality relations =

Generalization of Lie groups

In mathematics, the Schur orthogonality relations, which were proven by Issai Schur through Schur's lemma, express a central fact about representations of finite groups. They admit a generalization to the case of compact groups in general, and in particular compact Lie groups, such as the rotation group SO(3).

== Finite groups ==
=== Intrinsic statement ===
The space of complex-valued class functions of a finite group G has a natural inner product:

$$\left\langle \alpha, \beta \right\rangle := \frac{1}{\left| G \right|}\sum_{g \in G} \alpha(g) \overline{\beta(g)}$$

where $\overline{\beta(g)}$ denotes the complex conjugate of the value of $\beta$ on g. With respect to this inner product, the irreducible characters form an orthonormal basis for the space of class functions, and this yields the orthogonality relation for the rows of the character table:

$$\left\langle \chi_i, \chi_j \right\rangle = \begin{cases} 0& \mbox{ if } i \ne j, \\ 1& \mbox{ if } i=j. \end{cases}$$

For $g, h \in G$, applying the same inner product to the columns of the character table yields:

$$\sum_{\chi_i} \chi_i(g) \overline{\chi_i(h)} = \begin{cases} \left| C_G(g) \right| & \mbox{ if } g, h \mbox{ are conjugate } \\ 0& \mbox{ otherwise.}\end{cases}$$

where the sum is over all of the irreducible characters $\chi_i$ of $G$, and $\left | C_G(g) \right |$ denotes the order of the centralizer of $g$. Note that since g and h are conjugate if they are in the same column of the character table, this implies that the columns of the character table are orthogonal.

The orthogonality relations can aid many computations including:

- decomposing an unknown character as a linear combination of irreducible characters;
- constructing the complete character table when only some of the irreducible characters are known;
- finding the orders of the centralizers of representatives of the conjugacy classes of a group; and
- finding the order of the group.

=== Coordinates statement ===
Let $\Gamma^{(\lambda)} (R)_{mn}$ be a matrix element of an irreducible matrix representation $\Gamma^{(\lambda)}$ of a finite group $G = \{R\}$ of order |G|. Since it can be proven that any matrix representation of any finite group is equivalent to a unitary representation, we assume $\Gamma^{(\lambda)}$ is unitary:

$$\sum_{n=1}^{l_\lambda} \; \Gamma^{(\lambda)} (R)_{nm}^*\;\Gamma^{(\lambda)} (R)_{nk} = \delta_{mk} \quad \hbox{for all}\quad R \in G,$$

where $l_\lambda$ is the (finite) dimension of the irreducible representation $\Gamma^{(\lambda)}$.

The orthogonality relations, only valid for matrix elements of irreducible representations, are:

$$\sum_{R\in G}^{|G|} \; \Gamma^{(\lambda)} (R)_{nm}^*\;\Gamma^{(\mu)} (R)_{n'm'} =
\delta_{\lambda\mu} \delta_{nn'}\delta_{mm'} \frac{|G|}{l_\lambda}.$$

Here $\Gamma^{(\lambda)} (R)_{nm}^*$ is the complex conjugate of $\Gamma^{(\lambda)} (R)_{nm}\,$ and the sum is over all elements of G. The Kronecker delta $\delta_{\lambda\mu}$ is 1 if the matrices are in the same irreducible representation $\Gamma^{(\lambda)} = \Gamma^{(\mu)}$. If $\Gamma^{(\lambda)}$ and $\Gamma^{(\mu)}$ are non-equivalent it is zero. The other two Kronecker delta's state that the row and column indices must be equal ($n=n'$ and $m=m'$) in order to obtain a non-vanishing result. This theorem is also known as the Great (or Grand) Orthogonality Theorem.

Every group has an identity representation (all group elements mapped to 1). This is an irreducible representation. The great orthogonality relations immediately imply that

$$\sum_{R\in G}^{|G|} \; \Gamma^{(\mu)} (R)_{nm} = 0$$

for $n,m=1,\ldots,l_\mu$ and any irreducible representation $\Gamma^{(\mu)}\,$ not equal to the identity representation.

=== Example of the permutation group on 3 objects ===
The 3! permutations of three objects form a group of order 6, commonly denoted S_{3} (the symmetric group of degree three). This group is isomorphic to the point group $C_{3v}$, consisting of a threefold rotation axis and three vertical mirror planes. The groups have a 2-dimensional irreducible representation (l = 2). In the case of S_{3} one usually labels this representation by the Young tableau $\lambda = [2,1]$ and in the case of $C_{3v}$ one usually writes $\lambda = E$. In both cases the representation consists of the following six real matrices, each representing a single group element:

$$\begin{pmatrix}
1 & 0 \\
0 & 1
\end{pmatrix}\quad\begin{pmatrix}
1 & 0 \\
0 & -1
\end{pmatrix}\quad\begin{pmatrix}
-\frac{1}{2} & \frac{\sqrt{3}}{2} \\
\frac{\sqrt{3}}{2}& \frac{1}{2}
\end{pmatrix}\quad\begin{pmatrix}
-\frac{1}{2} & -\frac{\sqrt{3}}{2} \\
-\frac{\sqrt{3}}{2}& \frac{1}{2}
\end{pmatrix}\quad\begin{pmatrix}
-\frac{1}{2} & \frac{\sqrt{3}}{2} \\
-\frac{\sqrt{3}}{2}& -\frac{1}{2}
\end{pmatrix}\quad\begin{pmatrix}
-\frac{1}{2} & -\frac{\sqrt{3}}{2} \\
\frac{\sqrt{3}}{2}& -\frac{1}{2}
\end{pmatrix}$$

The normalization of the (1,1) element:

$$\sum_{R \in G}^{6} \; \Gamma(R)_{11}^*\;\Gamma(R)_{11} = 1^2 + 1^2 + \left(-\tfrac{1}{2}\right)^2 + \left(-\tfrac{1}{2}\right)^2 + \left(-\tfrac{1}{2}\right)^2 + \left(-\tfrac{1}{2}\right)^2
= 3.$$

In the same manner one can show the normalization of the other matrix elements: (2,2), (1,2), and (2,1). The orthogonality of the (1,1) and (2,2) elements:

$$\sum_{R\in G}^{6} \; \Gamma(R)_{11}^*\;\Gamma(R)_{22} = 1^2+(1)(-1)+\left(-\tfrac{1}{2}\right)\left(\tfrac{1}{2}\right)
+\left(-\tfrac{1}{2}\right)\left(\tfrac{1}{2}\right)
+\left(-\tfrac{1}{2}\right)^2 +\left(-\tfrac{1}{2}\right)^2
= 0 .$$

Similar relations hold for the orthogonality of the elements (1,1) and (1,2), etc. One verifies easily in the example that all sums of corresponding matrix elements vanish because of the orthogonality of the given irreducible representation to the identity representation.

=== Direct implications ===
The trace of a matrix is a sum of diagonal matrix elements,

$$\operatorname{Tr}\big(\Gamma(R)\big) = \sum_{m=1}^{l} \Gamma(R)_{mm}.$$

The collection of traces is the character $\chi \equiv \{\operatorname{Tr}\big(\Gamma(R)\big)\;|\; R \in G\}$ of a representation. Often one writes for the trace of a matrix in an irreducible representation with character $\chi^{(\lambda)}$

$$\chi^{(\lambda)} (R)\equiv \operatorname{Tr}\left(\Gamma^{(\lambda)}(R)\right).$$

In this notation we can write several character formulas:

$$\sum_{R\in G}^{|G|} \chi^{(\lambda)}(R)^* \, \chi^{(\mu)}(R)= \delta_{\lambda\mu} |G|,$$

which allows us to check whether or not a representation is irreducible. (The formula means that the lines in any character table have to be orthogonal vectors.) And

$$\sum_{R\in G}^{|G|} \chi^{(\lambda)}(R)^* \, \chi(R) = n^{(\lambda)} |G|,$$

which helps us to determine how often the irreducible representation $\Gamma^{(\lambda)}$ is contained within the reducible representation $\Gamma \,$ with character $\chi(R)$.

For instance, if

$$n^{(\lambda)}\, |G| = 96$$

and the order of the group is

$$|G| = 24\,$$

then the number of times that $\Gamma^{(\lambda)}\,$ is contained within the given reducible representation $\Gamma \,$ is

$$n^{(\lambda)} = 4\, .$$

See Character theory for more about group characters.

== Compact groups ==
The generalization of the orthogonality relations from finite groups to compact groups (which include compact Lie groups such as SO(3)) is basically simple: Replace the summation over the group by an integration over the group.

Every compact group $G$ has unique bi-invariant Haar measure, so that the volume of the group is 1. Denote this measure by $dg$. Let $(\pi^\alpha)$ be a complete set of irreducible representations of $G$, and let $\phi^\alpha_{v,w}(g)=\langle v,\pi^\alpha(g)w\rangle$ be a matrix coefficient of the representation $\pi^\alpha$. The orthogonality relations can then be stated in two parts:

1) If $\pi^\alpha \ncong \pi^\beta$ then

$$\int_G \phi^\alpha_{v,w}(g)\overline{\phi^\beta_{v',w'}(g)}dg=0$$

2) If $\{e_i\}$ is an orthonormal basis of the representation space $\pi^\alpha$ then

$$\int_G \phi^\alpha_{e_i,e_j}(g)\overline{\phi^\alpha_{e_m,e_n}(g)}dg=\delta_{i,m}\delta_{j,n}\frac{1}{d^\alpha}$$

where $d^\alpha$ is the dimension of $\pi^\alpha$. These orthogonality relations and the fact that all of the representations have finite dimensions are consequences of the Peter–Weyl theorem.

=== An example: SO(3) ===
An example of an r = 3 parameter group is the matrix group SO(3) consisting of all 3 × 3 orthogonal matrices with unit determinant. A possible parametrization of this group is in terms of Euler angles: $\mathbf{x} = (\alpha, \beta, \gamma)$ (see e.g., this article for the explicit form of an element of SO(3) in terms of Euler angles). The bounds are $0 \le\alpha, \gamma \le 2\pi$ and $0 \le \beta \le\pi$.

Not only the recipe for the computation of the volume element $\omega(\mathbf{x})\, dx_1 dx_2\cdots dx_r$ depends on the chosen parameters, but also the final result, i.e. the analytic form of the weight function (measure) $\omega(\mathbf{x})$.

For instance, the Euler angle parametrization of SO(3) gives the weight $\omega(\alpha,\beta,\gamma) = \sin\! \beta \,,$ while the n, ψ parametrization gives the weight $\omega(\psi,\theta,\phi) = 2(1-\cos\psi)\sin\!\theta\,$ with $0\le \psi \le \pi, \;\; 0 \le\phi\le 2\pi,\;\; 0 \le \theta \le \pi.$

It can be shown that the irreducible matrix representations of compact Lie groups are finite-dimensional and can be chosen to be unitary:

$$\Gamma^{(\lambda)}(R^{-1}) =\Gamma^{(\lambda)}(R)^{-1}=\Gamma^{(\lambda)}(R)^\dagger\quad \hbox{with}\quad \Gamma^{(\lambda)}(R)^\dagger_{mn} \equiv \Gamma^{(\lambda)}(R)^*_{nm}.$$

With the shorthand notation

$$\Gamma^{(\lambda)}(\mathbf{x})= \Gamma^{(\lambda)}\Big(R(\mathbf{x})\Big)$$

the orthogonality relations take the form

$$\int_{x_1^0}^{x_1^1} \cdots \int_{x_r^0}^{x_r^1}\; \Gamma^{(\lambda)}(\mathbf{x})^*_{nm} \Gamma^{(\mu)}(\mathbf{x})_{n'm'}\; \omega(\mathbf{x}) dx_1\cdots dx_r \; = \delta_{\lambda \mu} \delta_{n n'} \delta_{m m'} \frac{|G|}{l_\lambda},$$

with the volume of the group:

$$|G| = \int_{x_1^0}^{x_1^1} \cdots \int_{x_r^0}^{x_r^1} \omega(\mathbf{x}) dx_1\cdots dx_r .$$

As an example we note that the irreducible representations of SO(3) are Wigner D-matrices $D^\ell(\alpha \beta \gamma)$, which are of dimension $2\ell+1$. Since

$$|\mathrm{SO}(3)| = \int_{0}^{2\pi} d\alpha \int_{0}^{\pi} \sin\!\beta\, d\beta \int_{0}^{2\pi} d\gamma = 8\pi^2,$$

they satisfy

$$\int_{0}^{2\pi} \int_{0}^{\pi} \int_{0}^{2\pi} D^{\ell}(\alpha \beta\gamma)^*_{nm} \; D^{\ell'}(\alpha \beta\gamma)_{n'm'}\; \sin\!\beta\, d\alpha\, d\beta\, d\gamma = \delta_{\ell\ell'}\delta_{nn'}\delta_{mm'} \frac{8\pi^2}{2\ell+1}.$$
