= Thomas Jones Enright =

American mathematician (1947–2019)

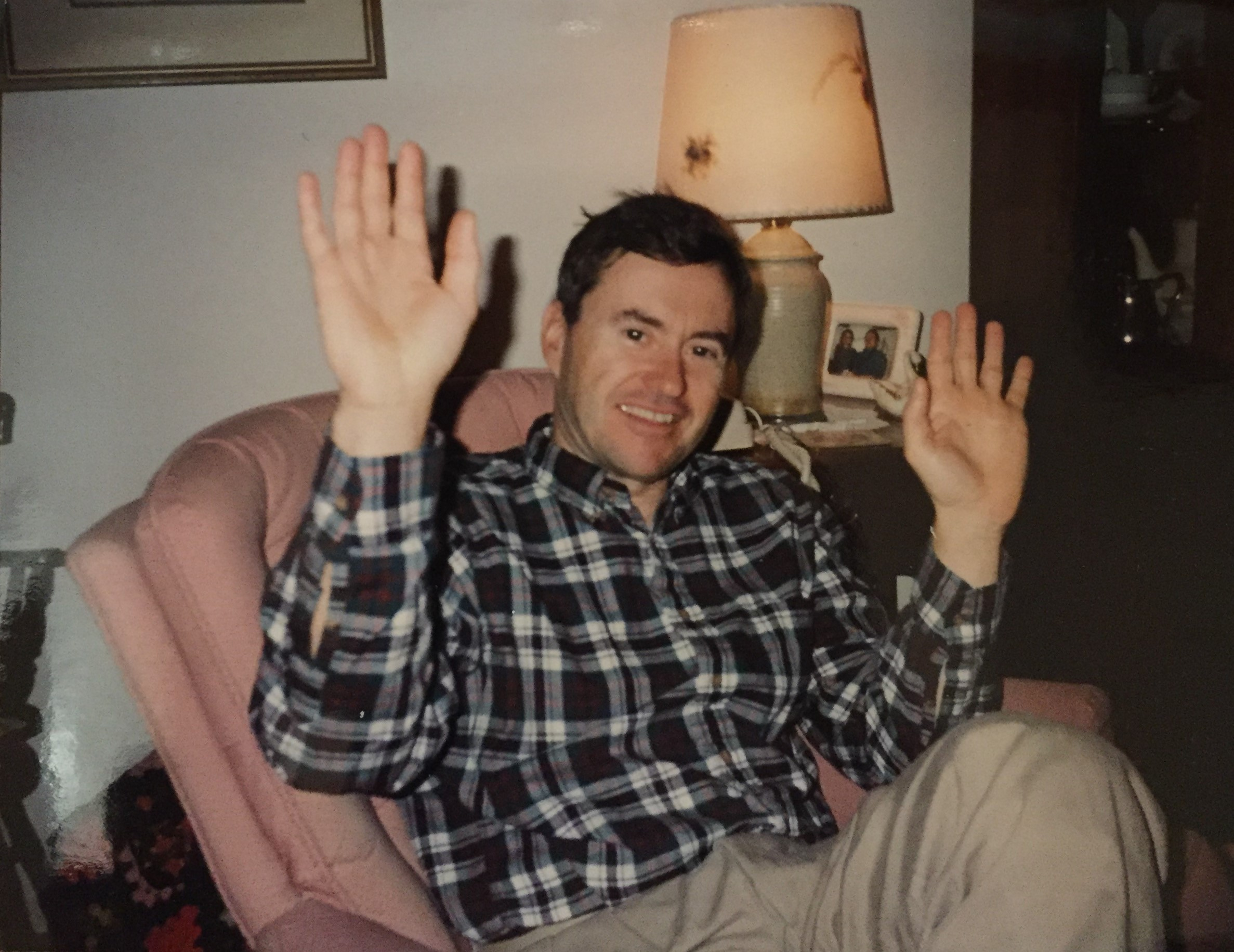
- Born: August 15, 1947; Concord, New Hampshire, United States
- Died: January 27, 2019 (aged 71); San Diego, California, United States
- Education: Harvard University B.S. & University of Washington Ph.D.
- Awards: Alfred P. Sloan Research Fellowship
- Scientific career
- Fields: Mathematics
- Workplaces: UCSD
- Doctoral advisor: Ramesh A. Gangolli

Thomas Jones Enright (August 15, 1947 – January 27, 2019) was an American mathematician known for his work in the algebraic theory of representations of real reductive Lie groups.

== Biography ==
Enright received a B.S. from Harvard University in 1969 and a Ph.D. in 1973 from the University of Washington under the direction of Ramesh A. Gangolli. From 1973 to 1975 he was the Hedrick Assistant Professor in UCLA working with Veeravalli S. Varadarajan, and spent the 1976-1977 year after in the Institute for Advanced Study at Princeton, N. J. before starting at University of California at San Diego in 1977. He was chair of the mathematics department of UCSD from 1986 to 1990. In 2010 he retired due to symptoms of Parkinson's disease.

== Contributions ==
In the mid-1970s, Enright introduced new methods that led him to an algebraic way of looking at discrete series (which were fundamental representations constructed by Harish-Chandra in the early 1960s), and to an algebraic proof of the Blattner multiplicity formula.

He was known for Enright–Varadarajan modules, Enright resolutions, and the Enright completion functor, which has had a lasting influence in algebra.

== Recognition ==
- Recipient of Alfred P. Sloan Fellowship, 1978
- Enright's work was the subject of a Bourbaki Seminar by Michel Duflo

== Bibliography ==
- Enright, Thomas J (1979). "On the Fundamental Series of a Real Semisimple Lie Algebra: Their Irreducibility, Resolutions and Multiplicity Formulae". Annals of Mathematics. 110 (1): 1–82. doi:10.2307/1971244. JSTOR 1971244.
- Enright, Thomas J.; Varadarajan, V. S. (1975). "On an Infinitesimal Characterization of the Discrete Series". Annals of Mathematics. 102 (1): 1–15. doi:10.2307/1970970. JSTOR 1970970.
- Enright, Thomas; Howe, Roger; Wallach, Nolan (1983-01-01). Trombi, P. C., ed. A Classification of Unitary Highest Weight Modules. Progress in Mathematics. Birkhäuser Boston. pp. 97–143. doi:10.1007/978-1-4684-6730-7_7. ISBN 9780817631352.
- Enright, T. J.; Wallach, N. R. (1980). "Notes on homological algebra and representations of Lie algebras". Duke Mathematical Journal. 47 (1): 1–15. doi:10.1215/S0012-7094-80-04701-8.
- Davidson, Mark G.; Enright, Thomas J.; Stanke, Ronald J. (1991). "Differential operators and highest weight representations". Memoirs of the American Mathematical Society. 94 (455): 0. doi:10.1090/memo/0455.
- Enright, Thomas J.; Hunziker, Markus; Pruett, W. Andrew (2014-01-01). Howe, Roger; Hunziker, Markus; Willenbring, Jeb F., eds. Diagrams of Hermitian type, highest weight modules, and syzygies of determinantal varieties. Progress in Mathematics. Springer New York. pp. 121–184. doi:10.1007/978-1-4939-1590-3_6. ISBN 9781493915897.
- Enright, Thomas J (1978). "On the algebraic construction and classification of Harish-Chandra modules". Proceedings of the National Academy of Sciences. 75 (3): 1063–1065. Bibcode:1978PNAS...75.1063E. doi:10.1073/pnas.75.3.1063. PMC 411407. PMID 16592507.
