= Robert James Blattner =

American mathematician (1931–2015)

Robert James Blattner (6 August 1931 – 13 June 2015) was a mathematics professor at UCLA working on harmonic analysis, representation theory, and geometric quantization, who introduced Blattner's conjecture. Born in Milwaukee, Blattner received his bachelor's degree from Harvard University in 1953 and his Ph.D. from the University of Chicago in 1957. He joined the UCLA mathematics department in 1957 and remained on the staff until his retirement as professor emeritus in 1992.

He was most widely known for a conjecture that he made, contained in the so-called Blattner formula, which suggested that a certain deep property of the discrete series of representations of a semi simple real Lie group was true. He made this conjecture in the mid 1960s. The discrete series, constructed by Harish-Chandra, which is basic to most central questions in harmonic analysis and arithmetic, was still very new and very difficult to penetrate. The conjecture was later proved and the solution was published in 1975 by Wilfried Schmid and Henryk Hecht by analytic methods, and later, in 1979 by Thomas Enright who used algebraic methods; both proofs were quite deep, giving an indication of the insight that led Blattner to this conjecture.

Blattner was a visiting scholar at the Institute for Advanced Study in 1964–65. In 2012 he became a fellow of the American Mathematical Society.
