= Stephan Jantzen =

Stephan Jantzen may refer to:

- Stephan Jantzen (icebreaker)
- Stephan Jantzen (seaman) (1827–1913), a seaman in Warnemünde, Rostock, Mecklenburg-Vorpommern, Germany

== See also ==
- Jantzen (disambiguation)
- Stephan (given name)
