= C-function =

In mathematics, c-function may refer to:

- Smooth function
- Harish-Chandra's c-function in the theory of Lie groups
- List of C functions for the programming language C
