= Fridrikh Karpelevich =

Russian mathematician (1927–2000)

Fridrikh Israilevich Karpelevich (Russian: Фридрих Израилевич Карпелевич; 2 October 1927 – 5 July 2000) was a Russian mathematician known for his work on semisimple Lie algebras, geometry, and probability theory. Together with Simon Gindikin, he discovered the Gindikin–Karpelevich formula.
