= Isotypical representation =

In group theory, an isotypical, primary or factor representation of a group G is a unitary representation $\pi : G \longrightarrow \mathcal{B}(\mathcal{H})$ such that any two subrepresentations have equivalent sub-subrepresentations. This is related to the notion of a primary or factor representation of a C*-algebra, or to the factor for a von Neumann algebra: the representation $\pi$ of G is isotypical iff $\pi(G)^{''}$ is a factor.

This term more generally used in the context of semisimple modules.

== Property ==
One interesting property of this notion lies in the fact that two isotypical representations are either quasi-equivalent or disjoint (in analogy with the fact that irreducible representations are either unitarily equivalent or disjoint).

This can be understood through the correspondence between factor representations and minimal central projection (in a von Neumann algebra). Two minimal central projections are then either equal or orthogonal.

== Example ==
Let G be a compact group. A corollary of the Peter–Weyl theorem has that any unitary representation $\pi : G \longrightarrow \mathcal{B}(\mathcal{H})$ on a separable Hilbert space $\mathcal{H}$ is a possibly infinite direct sum of finite dimensional irreducible representations. An isotypical representation is any direct sum of equivalent irreducible representations that appear (typically multiple times) in $\mathcal{H}$.

== Bibliography ==
- Deitmar, A.; Echterhoff, S. (2014). Principles of Harmonic Analysis. Universitext. Springer International Publishing. ISBN 978-3-319-05792-7.
- Dixmier, Jacques (1982). C*-algebras. North-Holland Publ. Co. ISBN 0-444-86391-5. OCLC 832825844.
