= Wilfried Schmid =

German-American mathematician

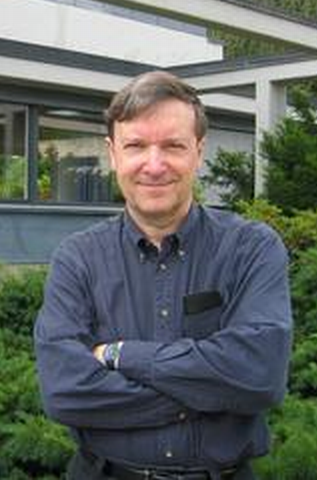
- Schmid at Mathematical Research Institute of Oberwolfach in 2006
- Born: May 28, 1943 (age 83); Hamburg, Germany
- Education: University of California, Berkeley
- Scientific career
- Fields: Mathematics
- Workplaces: Harvard University; Columbia University
- Doctoral advisor: Phillip Griffiths
- Doctoral students: Carlos Simpson

Wilfried Schmid (born May 28, 1943) is a German-born American mathematician who works in Hodge theory, representation theory, and automorphic forms.

Schmid was raised in Bonn where his father Wolfgang Schmid (1913–1980) served as a professor of classics. In 1960, Schmid followed his father to Princeton when the latter was a fellow at the Institute for Advanced Study. After graduating as valedictorian of Princeton University's class of 1964, Schmid earned his Ph.D. at University of California, Berkeley in 1967 under the direction of Phillip Griffiths, and then taught at Berkeley and Columbia University, becoming a full professor at Columbia at age 27. In 1978, he moved to Harvard University, where he served as the Dwight Parker Robinson Professor of Mathematics until his retirement in 2019.

Schmid's early work concerns the construction of discrete series representations of semi-simple Lie groups. Notable accomplishments here include a proof of the Langlands conjecture on the discrete series, along with a later proof (joint with Michael Atiyah) constructing all such discrete series representations on spaces of harmonic spinors. Schmid, along with his student Henryk Hecht, proved Blattner's conjecture in 1975. In the 1970s, he described the singularities of the Griffith's period map by applying Lie-theoretic methods to problems in algebraic geometry.

Schmid has been very involved in K–12 mathematics education in his home state, and both nationally and internationally. His interest arose in 1999 after being disturbed by the experiences of his 2nd-grade daughter, Sabina, in her mathematics class. He was heavily involved in the drafting of the Massachusetts Mathematics Curriculum Framework in 2000. Later, he served on the National Mathematics Advisory Panel of the U.S. Department of Education. He has opposed new ways of teaching children that would neglect basic math skills.

In 2012, he became a fellow of the American Mathematical Society and in 2020 he was elected as a member of the U.S. National Academy of Sciences.
