= Robert Blattner =

Robert Blattner may refer to:

- Buddy Blattner (1920–2009), American table tennis and baseball player
- Robert James Blattner (1931–2015), American mathematician
