= Ξ function =

In mathematics, the Ξ function (named for the Greek letter Ξ or Xi) may refer to:

- Riemann Xi function, a variant of the Riemann zeta function with a simpler functional equation
- Harish-Chandra's Ξ function, a special spherical function on a semisimple Lie group
