= Vyjayanthi Chari =

Indian–American mathematician (born 1958)

- Occupations: Professor, Mathematician

Academic background
- Education: University of Mumbai (BSc, MSc, PhD)
- Doctoral advisor: Rajagopalan Parthasarathy

Academic work
- Discipline: Mathematics
- Sub-discipline: Representation theory, quantum algebra
- Institutions: University of California, Riverside

Vyjayanthi Chari (born 1958) is an Indian–American Distinguished Professor and the F. Burton Jones Endowed Chair for Pure Mathematics at the University of California, Riverside, known for her research in representation theory and quantum algebra. In 2015 she was elected as a fellow of the American Mathematical Society.

== Education ==
Chari has a bachelor's, master's, and doctoral degree from the University of Mumbai. Chari received her Ph.D. from the University of Mumbai under the supervision of Rajagopalan Parthasarathy.

== Professional career ==
Following her Ph.D., she became a fellow at the Tata Institute of Fundamental Research, Mumbai. In 1991, she joined the University of California, Riverside (UCR) where she is now a Distinguished Professor of Mathematics. During her career, she has had several visiting positions. They were: invited senior participant at the Mittag-Leffler Institute, Sweden; an invited professor at the University of Cologne, Germany; an invited professor at Paris 7, France; an invited research fellow at Brown University, RI; and an invited senior participant at Hausdorff Research Institute for Mathematics, Bonn, Germany; and visiting professor at the University of Rome Tor Vergata, Italy.

She is also the editor of the Pacific Journal of Mathematics and the Editor in Chief of Algebras and Representation Theory.

With Andrew N. Pressley, she is the author of the book A Guide to Quantum Groups (Cambridge University Press, 1994).

== Honors ==
- The Doctoral Dissertation Advisor/Mentor Award from the UCR Academic Senate.
- American Mathematical Society 2016 Class of Fellows.
- Simons Fellow 2019–2020.
- Infosys Visiting Chair Professor, Indian Institute of Science, 2019–2023.
