= Holomorphic discrete series representation =

Representation of semisimple Lie groups

In mathematics, a holomorphic discrete series representation is a discrete series representation of a semisimple Lie group that can be represented in a natural way as a Hilbert space of holomorphic functions. The simple Lie groups with holomorphic discrete series are those whose symmetric space is Hermitian. Holomorphic discrete series representations are the easiest discrete series representations to study because they have highest or lowest weights, which makes their behavior similar to that of finite-dimensional representations of compact Lie groups.

Bargmann (1947) found the first examples of holomorphic discrete series representations, and Harish-Chandra (1954, 1955a, 1955c, 1956a, 1956b) classified them for all semisimple Lie groups.

Martens (1975) and Hecht (1976) described the characters of holomorphic discrete series representations.

== See also ==
- Quaternionic discrete series representation
