= Harish-Chandra transform =

In mathematical representation theory, the Harish-Chandra transform is a linear map from functions on a reductive Lie group to functions on a parabolic subgroup. It was introduced by Harish-Chandra (1958, p.595).

The Harish-Chandra transform f^{P} of a function f on the group G is given by

$$f^P(m) =a^{-\rho}\int_Nf(nm)\,dn$$

where P = MAN is the Langlands decomposition of a parabolic subgroup.
