= Quaternionic discrete series representation =

In mathematics, a quaternionic discrete series representation is a discrete series representation of a semisimple Lie group G associated with a quaternionic structure on the symmetric space of G. They were introduced by Gross and Wallach (1994, 1996).

Quaternionic discrete series representations exist when the maximal compact subgroup of the group G has a normal subgroup isomorphic to SU(2). Every complex simple Lie group has a real form with quaternionic discrete series representations. In particular the classical groups SU(2,n), SO(4,n), and Sp(1,n) have quaternionic discrete series representations.

Quaternionic representations are analogous to holomorphic discrete series representations, which exist when the symmetric space of the group has a complex structure. The groups SU(2,n) have both holomorphic and quaternionic discrete series representations.

== See also ==
- Quaternionic symmetric space
