= Harish-Chandra module =

In mathematics, specifically in the representation theory of Lie groups, a Harish-Chandra module, named after the Indian-American mathematician and physicist Harish-Chandra, is a representation of a real Lie group, associated to a general representation, with regularity and finiteness conditions. When the associated representation is a $(\mathfrak{g},K)$-module, then its Harish-Chandra module is a representation with desirable factorization properties.

== Definition ==
Let G be a Lie group and K a compact subgroup of G. If $(\pi,V)$ is a representation of G, then the Harish-Chandra module of $\pi$ is the subspace X of V consisting of the K-finite smooth vectors in V. This means that X includes exactly those vectors v such that the map $\varphi_v : G \longrightarrow V$ via

$$\varphi_v(g) = \pi(g)v$$

is smooth, and the subspace

$$\text{span}\{\pi(k)v : k\in K\}$$

is finite-dimensional.

== Notes ==
In 1973, Lepowsky showed that any irreducible $(\mathfrak{g},K)$-module X is isomorphic to the Harish-Chandra module of an irreducible representation of G on a Hilbert space. Such representations are admissible, meaning that they decompose in a manner analogous to the prime factorization of integers. (Of course, the decomposition may have infinitely many distinct factors!) Further, a result of Harish-Chandra indicates that if G is a reductive Lie group with maximal compact subgroup K, and X is an irreducible $(\mathfrak{g},K)$-module with a positive definite Hermitian form satisfying

$$\langle k\cdot v, w \rangle = \langle v, k^{-1}\cdot w \rangle$$

and

$$\langle Y\cdot v, w \rangle = -\langle v, Y\cdot w \rangle$$

for all $Y\in \mathfrak{g}$ and $k\in K$, then X is the Harish-Chandra module of a unique irreducible unitary representation of G.

== See also ==
- (g,K)-module
- Admissible representation
- Unitary representation
