= Fritz Peter =

German mathematician

Fritz Peter (1899–1949) was a German mathematician who helped prove the Peter–Weyl theorem. He was a student of Hermann Weyl, and later became headmaster of a secondary school (Hawkins 2000, p.502).

== Publications ==
- Peter, F.; Weyl, H. (1927), "Die Vollständigkeit der primitiven Darstellungen einer geschlossenen kontinuierlichen Gruppe", Mathematische Annalen, 97: 737–755, doi:10.1007/BF01447892.
