= Plancherel measure =

Measure on group representations

In mathematics, the Plancherel measure is a measure defined on the set of irreducible unitary representations of a locally compact group, that describes how the regular representation breaks up into irreducible unitary representations. It is named after the Swiss mathematician Michel Plancherel.

== Definition for finite groups ==
Let $G$ be a finite group, and $G^\wedge$ its set of irreducible representations. The Plancherel measure over the set $G^\wedge$ is defined by

$$\mu(\pi) = \frac{(\mathrm{dim}\,\pi)^2}{|G|},$$

where $\pi\in G^\wedge$ is an irreducible representation and $\mathrm{dim}\,\pi$ its dimension.

=== Symmetric group ===
An important special case is the case of the finite symmetric group $S_n$, where $n$ is a positive integer. For this group, the set $S_n^\wedge$ of irreducible representations is in natural bijection with the set of integer partitions of $n$. For an irreducible representation associated with an integer partition $\lambda$, its dimension is known to be equal to $f^\lambda$, the number of standard Young tableaux of shape $\lambda$, so in this case the Plancherel measure is often thought of as a measure on the set of integer partitions of given order $n$, given by

$$\mu(\lambda) = \frac{(f^\lambda)^2}{n!}.$$

The fact that those probabilities sum up to 1 follows from the combinatorial identity

$$\sum_{\lambda \vdash n}(f^\lambda)^2 = n!,$$

which corresponds to the bijective nature of the Robinson–Schensted correspondence.

== Applications ==
The Plancherel measure appears naturally in combinatorial and probabilistic problems, especially in the study of longest increasing subsequence of a random permutation. As a result of its importance in that area, in many research papers the term "Plancherel measure" almost exclusively refers to the case of the symmetric group $S_n$.

=== Connection to longest increasing subsequence ===
Let $L(\sigma)$ denote the length of a longest increasing subsequence of a random permutation $\sigma$ in $S_n$ chosen according to the uniform distribution. Let $\lambda$ denote the shape of the corresponding Young tableau related to $\sigma$ by the Robinson–Schensted correspondence. Then the following identity holds:

$$L(\sigma) = \lambda_1,$$

where $\lambda_1$ denotes the length of the first row of $\lambda$. Furthermore, from the fact that the Robinson–Schensted correspondence is bijective it follows that the distribution of $\lambda$ is exactly the Plancherel measure on $S_n$. So, to understand the behavior of $L(\sigma)$, it is natural to look at $\lambda_1$ with $\lambda$ chosen according to the Plancherel measure in $S_n$, since these two random variables have the same probability distribution.

=== Poissonized Plancherel measure ===
In various studies of the asymptotic behavior of $L(\sigma)$ as $n \rightarrow \infty$, it has proved useful to extend the measure to a measure, called the Poissonized Plancherel measure, on the set $\mathcal{P}^*$ of all integer partitions. For any $\theta > 0$, the Poissonized Plancherel measure with parameter $\theta$ on the set $\mathcal{P}^*$ is defined by

$$\mu_\theta(\lambda) = e^{-\theta}\frac{\theta^{|\lambda|}(f^\lambda)^2}{(|\lambda|!)^2},$$

for all $\lambda \in \mathcal{P}^*$.

=== Plancherel growth process ===
The Plancherel growth process is a random sequence of Young diagrams

$$\lambda^{(1)} = (1),\lambda^{(2)},\lambda^{(3)},\dots,$$

such that each $\lambda^{(n)}$ is a random Young diagram of order $n$ whose probability distribution is the $n$th Plancherel measure, and each successive $\lambda^{(n)}$ is obtained from its predecessor $\lambda^{(n-1)}$ by the addition of a single box, according to the transition probability

$$p(\nu, \lambda) = \mathbb{P}(\lambda^{(n)}=\lambda~|~\lambda^{(n-1)}=\nu) = \frac{f^{\lambda}}{nf^{\nu}},$$

for any given Young diagrams $\nu$ and $\lambda$ of sizes $n-1$ and $n$, respectively.

The Plancherel growth process can be viewed as a natural coupling of the different Plancherel measures of all the symmetric groups, or alternatively as a random walk on Young's lattice. It is not difficult to show that the probability distribution of $\lambda^{(n)}$ in this walk coincides with the Plancherel measure on $S_n$.

== Specific groups ==
=== Compact groups ===
The Plancherel measure for compact groups is similar to that for finite groups, except that the measure need not be finite. The unitary dual is a discrete set of finite-dimensional representations, and the Plancherel measure of an irreducible finite-dimensional representation is proportional to its dimension.

=== Abelian groups ===
The unitary dual of a locally compact abelian group is another locally compact abelian group, and the Plancherel measure is proportional to the Haar measure of the dual group.

=== Semisimple Lie groups ===
The Plancherel measure for semisimple Lie groups was found by Harish-Chandra. The support is the set of tempered representations, and in particular not all unitary representations need occur in the support.
