= Zuckerman functor =

In mathematics, a Zuckerman functor is used to construct representations of real reductive Lie groups from representations of Levi subgroups. They were introduced by Gregg Zuckerman (1978). The Bernstein functor is closely related.

== Notation and terminology ==
- G is a connected reductive real affine algebraic group (for simplicity; the theory works for more general groups), and g is the Lie algebra of G.
- K is a maximal compact subgroup of G.
- A (g,K)-module is a vector space with compatible actions of g and K, on which the action of K is K-finite. A representation of K is called K-finite if every vector is contained in a finite-dimensional representation of K.
- W_{K} is the subspace of K-finite vectors of a representation W of K.
- R(g,K) is the Hecke algebra of G of all distributions on G with support in K that are left and right K finite. This is a ring which does not have an identity but has an approximate identity, and the approximately unital R(g,K)- modules are the same as (g,K) modules.
- L is a Levi subgroup of G, the centralizer of a compact connected abelian subgroup, and l is the Lie algebra of L.

== Definition ==
The Zuckerman functor Γ is defined by

$$\Gamma^{g,K}_{g,L\cap K}(W) = \hom_{R(g,L\cap K)}(R(g,K),W)_K$$

and the Bernstein functor Π is defined by

$$\Pi^{g,K}_{g,L\cap K}(W) = R(g,K)\otimes_{R(g,L\cap K)}W.$$
