= Anthony W. Knapp =

American mathematician (born 1941)

Anthony William Knapp (born 2 December 1941, Morristown, New Jersey) is an American mathematician and professor emeritus at the State University of New York, Stony Brook working in representation theory. For much of his career, Knapp was a professor at Cornell University.

== Education ==
Knapp lived in Baltimore, Maryland, and graduated from the preparatory McDonogh School nearby. He attended Dartmouth College, graduating from there in 1962 and receiving a National Science Foundation Graduate Fellowship to continue his studies. Knapp received his Ph.D. in 1965 from Princeton University under the supervision of Salomon Bochner.

== Teaching ==
Knapp began his career as a C. L. E. Moore instructor for two years at the Massachusetts Institute of Technology, before gaining a position as an assistant professor at Cornell University in 1967. He was promoted to associate professor there in 1970 and full professor in 1975. Knapp began spending some of his time at SUNY Stony Brook in 1986 and took a full-time position there in 1990.

== Research ==
In a series of papers from 1976 to 1984, Knapp and Gregg Zuckerman gave the classification of tempered representations of semisimple Lie groups.

== Awards and honors ==
He won the Leroy P. Steele Prize for Mathematical Exposition in 1997. In 2012 he became a fellow of the American Mathematical Society.

== Selected publications ==
- Knapp, Anthony William (2006). Basic algebra. Cornerstones. Boston, MA: Birkhäuser Boston Springer e-books Imprint: Birkhäuser. ISBN 978-0-8176-4529-8. (Book review) by Werner Kleinert (1945–2019), Humboldt University of Berlin
- Knapp, Anthony W. (2007). Advanced algebra. Cornerstones. Boston, Mass. London: Birkhauser Springer [distributor]. ISBN 978-0-8176-4613-4. (Book review) by Werner Kleinert
- Elliptic curves. – Princeton, 1992 (Mathematical notes; 40) ISBN 0-691-08559-5 Zbl.0804.14013
- Representation theory of semisimple groups : An overview based on examples, (Originally publ. 1986) Princeton: University Press, 2001. (Princeton Landmarks in Mathematics) ISBN 0-691-09089-0.
- Lie Groups: Beyond an Introduction, (Originally publ. 1996) Second Edition, Progress in Mathematics, Vol. 140, Birkhäuser, Boston, 2002. ISBN 0-8176-4259-5.
- (with David A. Vogan) Cohomological Induction and Unitary Representations, Princeton Mathematical Series 45, Princeton University Press, Princeton, New Jersey, 1995.
- (with Gregg Zuckerman) Classification of irreducible tempered representations of semisimple Lie groups Proceedings of the National Academy of Sciences of the United States of America 73, No. 7 (Jul. 1976), pp. 2178–2180
- (with Gregg Zuckerman) "Classification of irreducible tempered representations of semisimple groups" Annals of Mathematics 116 (1982) 389–501, correction 119 (1984) 639.
