= Harish-Chandra integral =

The Harish-Chandra integral is a concept from integral calculus that originated in the study of harmonic analysis on Lie groups. Closely related is the Harish-Chandra formula which is used to evaluate the integral.

The integrals are named after the Indian mathematician Harish-Chandra, who proved in 1957 the so-called Harish-Chandra formula. Today, the integral and its associated formula find applications in many fields, such as representation theory, random matrix theory and quantum field theory.

A special case is the formula for integrals over the unitary group which was independently discovered in 1980 by Claude Itzykson and Jean-Bernard Zuber and applied to quantum field theory. The integral over the unitary group is also referred to as the Harish-Chandra–Itzykson–Zuber integral.

== Definition ==
Let $G$ be a connected, semisimple compact Lie group and let $\mathrm{d}g$ be the Haar probability measure. Let $\mathfrak{g} = \operatorname{Lie}(G)$ be its Lie algebra and $\mathfrak{t} \subset \mathfrak{g}$ be the Cartan subalgebra (or its complexification $\mathfrak{t} \subset \mathfrak{g}_{\mathbb{C}}$).

The Harish-Chandra integral is the function

$$H(x,y):=\int_G e^{\langle \operatorname{Ad}_g x, y \rangle} \mathrm{d}g$$

for $x, y \in \mathfrak{t}$, where $\operatorname{Ad}$ denotes the adjoint representation, and $\langle \cdot {,} \cdot \rangle$ is the Killing form.

== Harish-Chandra formula ==
Let $G$ be connected and semisimple, and let $R^+$ denote the positive root system of $\mathfrak{t}$. Then

$$\Delta_{\mathfrak{t}}(x)\Delta_{\mathfrak{t}}(y)\int_G e^{\langle \operatorname{Ad}_gx,y\rangle}\mathrm{d}g=\frac{[\![\Delta_{\mathfrak{t}}, \Delta_{\mathfrak{t}}]\!]}{|W|}\sum\limits_{w\in W}\varepsilon(w)e^{\langle w(x),y \rangle}$$,

where

- $W$ is the Weyl group acting on $\mathfrak{t}$,
- $\Delta_{\mathfrak{t}}(x) := \prod_{\alpha \in R^+} \langle \alpha, x \rangle$ is a polynomial function called the discriminant,
- $\varepsilon(w) := (-1)^{|w|}$ is the signature,
- $[\![\Delta_{\mathfrak{t}}, \Delta_{\mathfrak{t}}]\!]$ is an inner product that extends the killing form to polynomial functions defined in the following way: If $p$ and $q$ are polynomial functions on the real Lie algebra $\mathfrak{g}$, write $p(x) = \sum{\beta} c_{\beta} x^{\beta}$ in real coordinates $x_1, \dots, x_n$, where $n = \dim \mathfrak{g}$. The associated differential operator is

$$p(\partial) = \sum_{\beta} c_{\beta} \frac{\partial^{|\beta|}}{\partial x^{\beta}}.$$

The bilinear form $[[p, q]]$ is defined by applying the differential operator $p(\partial)$ to $q(x)$ then evaluating the result at the zero, i.e.

$$[[p, q]] := p(\partial)q(x) \bigg|_{x = 0}.$$
