= Rajagopalan Parthasarathy =

Indian mathematician (born 1945)

- Born: 6 October 1945 (age 80)
- Education: IIT Madras, University of Bombay
- Known for: Hotta-Parthasarathy theorem, Blattner's conjecture
- Awards: Shanti Swarup Bhatnagar Prize for Science and Technology
- Scientific career
- Fields: Representation theory of Lie groups and algebras in mathematics
- Workplaces: Tata Institute of Fundamental Research, Mumbai

Rajagopalan Parthasarathy is an Indian mathematician who specialised in representation theory of Lie groups and algebras.

He was awarded in 1985 the Shanti Swarup Bhatnagar Prize for Science and Technology, the highest science award in India, in the mathematical sciences category.

Prof. Parthasarathy is an expert in representation theory of semisimple Lie groups. His initial work was on the realization of the so-called discrete series of representations of a semisimple Lie group in the space of Dirac Spinors. He made considerable progress in many central problems in representation theory. His work on the resolution of the Blattner's conjecture and the question of unitarisability of certain highest weight modules are significant contributions to this area in mathematics.
