= Gregg Zuckerman =

American mathematician (born 1949)

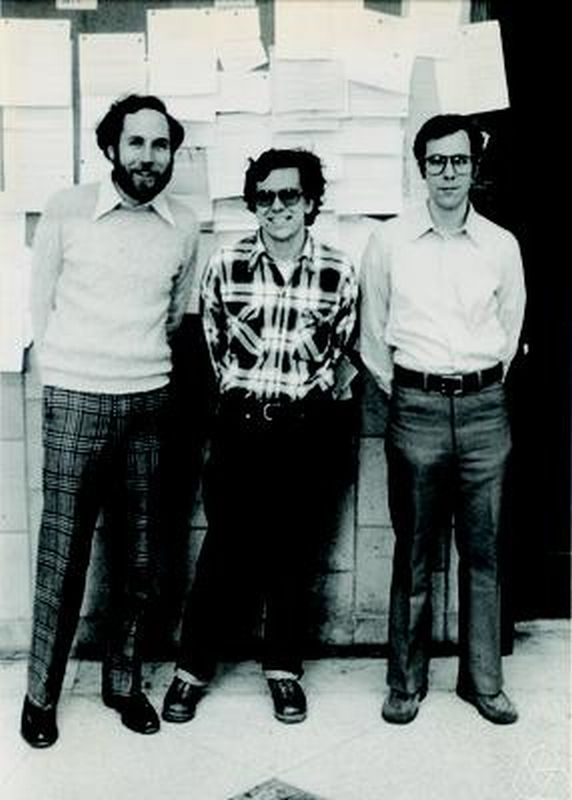
From left: Gregg Zuckerman, David J. Saltman, Robert Fefferman, Yale 1979

Gregg Jay Zuckerman (born 1949) is a mathematician and professor at Yale University working in representation theory. He discovered Zuckerman functors and translation functors, and with Anthony W. Knapp classified the irreducible tempered representations of semisimple Lie groups.

== Education ==
He received his Ph.D. in mathematics from Princeton University in 1975 after completing a doctoral dissertation, titled "Some character identities for semisimple Lie groups", under the supervision of Elias M. Stein.

== Research ==
In the late 1970s, Zuckerman and Jens Carsten Jantzen independently introduced translation functors. In 1978, he introduced the Zuckerman functor.

In a series of papers from 1976 to 1984, Anthony W. Knapp and Zuckerman gave the classification of tempered representations of semisimple Lie groups.
