= Translation functor =

In mathematical representation theory, a translation functor is a functor taking representations of a Lie algebra to representations with a possibly different central character. Translation functors were introduced independently by Zuckerman (1977) and Jantzen (1979). Roughly speaking, the functor is given by taking a tensor product with a finite-dimensional representation, and then taking a subspace with some central character.

== Definition ==
By the Harish-Chandra isomorphism, the characters of the center Z of the universal enveloping algebra of a complex reductive Lie algebra can be identified with the points of L⊗C/W, where L is the weight lattice and W is the Weyl group. If λ is a point of L⊗C/W then write χ_{λ} for the corresponding character of Z.

A representation of the Lie algebra is said to have central character χ_{λ} if every vector v is a generalized eigenvector of the center Z with eigenvalue χ_{λ}; in other words if z∈Z and v∈V then (z − χ_{λ}(z))^{n}(v)=0 for some n.

The translation functor ψ^{μ}_{λ} takes representations V with central character χ_{λ} to representations with central character χ_{μ}. It is constructed in two steps:

- First take the tensor product of V with an irreducible finite dimensional representation with highest weight λ−μ (if one exists).
- Then take the generalized eigenspace of this with eigenvalue χ_{μ}.
