= Jantzen filtration =

In representation theory, a Jantzen filtration is a filtration of a Verma module of a semisimple Lie algebra, or a Weyl module of a reductive algebraic group of positive characteristic. Jantzen filtrations were introduced by Jantzen (1979).

== Jantzen filtration for Verma modules ==
If M(λ) is a Verma module of a semisimple Lie algebra with highest weight λ, then the Janzen filtration is a decreasing filtration

$$M(\lambda)=M(\lambda)^0\supseteq M(\lambda)^1\supseteq M(\lambda)^2\supseteq\cdots.$$

It has the following properties:

- M(λ)^{1}=N(λ), the unique maximal proper submodule of M(λ)
- The quotients M(λ)^{i}/M(λ)^{i+1} have non-degenerate contravariant bilinear forms.
- The Jantzen sum formula holds:

$$\sum_{i>0}\text{Ch}(M(\lambda)^i) = \sum_{\alpha>0, s_\alpha(\lambda)<\lambda}\text{Ch}(M(s_\alpha \cdot \lambda))$$
where $\text{Ch}(\cdot)$ denotes the formal character.
