= Harish-Chandra's c-function =

Function named after Harish Chandra

In mathematics, Harish-Chandra's c-function is a function related to the intertwining operator between two principal series representations, that appears in the Plancherel measure for semisimple Lie groups. Harish-Chandra (1958a, 1958b) introduced a special case of it defined in terms of the asymptotic behavior of a zonal spherical function of a Lie group, and Harish-Chandra (1970) introduced a more general c-function called Harish-Chandra's (generalized) C-function. Gindikin and Karpelevich (1962, 1969) introduced the Gindikin–Karpelevich formula, a product formula for Harish-Chandra's c-function.

== Gindikin–Karpelevich formula ==
The c-function has a generalization c_{w}(λ) depending on an element w of the Weyl group. The unique element of greatest length s_{0}, is the unique element that carries the Weyl chamber $\mathfrak{a}_+^*$ onto $-\mathfrak{a}_+^*$. By Harish-Chandra's integral formula, c_{s_{0}} is Harish-Chandra's c-function:

$$c(\lambda)=c_{s_0}(\lambda).$$

The c-functions are in general defined by the equation

$$\displaystyle A(s,\lambda)\xi_0 =c_s(\lambda)\xi_0,$$

where ξ_{0} is the constant function 1 in L^{2}(K/M). The cocycle property of the intertwining operators implies a similar multiplicative property for the c-functions:

$$c_{s_1s_2}(\lambda) =c_{s_1}(s_2 \lambda)c_{s_2}(\lambda)$$

provided

$$\ell(s_1s_2)=\ell(s_1)+\ell(s_2).$$

This reduces the computation of c_{s} to the case when s = s_{α}, the reflection in a (simple) root α, the so-called "rank-one reduction" of Gindikin & Karpelevich (1962). In fact the integral involves only the closed connected subgroup G^{α} corresponding to the Lie subalgebra generated by $\mathfrak{g}_{\pm \alpha}$ where α lies in Σ_{0}^{+}. Then G^{α} is a real semisimple Lie group with real rank one, i.e. dim A^{α} = 1, and c_{s} is just the Harish-Chandra c-function of G^{α}. In this case the c-function can be computed directly and is given by

$$c_{s_\alpha}(\lambda)=c_0{2^{-i(\lambda,\alpha_0)}\Gamma(i(\lambda,\alpha_0))\over\Gamma({1\over 2} ({1\over 2}m_\alpha + 1+ i(\lambda,\alpha_0)) \Gamma({1\over 2} ({1\over 2}m_\alpha + m_{2\alpha} + i(\lambda,\alpha_0))},$$

where

$$c_0=2^{m_\alpha/2 + m_{2\alpha}}\Gamma\left({1\over 2} (m_\alpha+m_{2\alpha} +1)\right)$$

and α_{0}=α/〈α,α〉.

The general Gindikin–Karpelevich formula for c(λ) is an immediate consequence of this formula and the multiplicative properties of c_{s}(λ), as follows:

$$c(\lambda)=c_0\prod_{\alpha\in\Sigma_0^+}{2^{-i(\lambda,\alpha_0)}\Gamma(i(\lambda,\alpha_0))\over\Gamma({1\over 2} ({1\over 2}m_\alpha + 1+ i(\lambda,\alpha_0)) \Gamma({1\over 2} ({1\over 2}m_\alpha + m_{2\alpha} + i(\lambda,\alpha_0))},$$

where the constant c_{0} is chosen so that c(–iρ)=1 (Helgason 2000, p.447).

== Plancherel measure ==
The c-function appears in the Plancherel theorem for spherical functions, and the Plancherel measure is 1/c^{2} times Lebesgue measure.

== p-adic Lie groups ==
There is a similar c-function for p-adic Lie groups. Macdonald (1968, 1971) and Langlands (1971) found an analogous product formula for the c-function of a p-adic Lie group.
