= Harish-Chandra's Schwartz space =

In mathematical abstract harmonic analysis, Harish-Chandra's Schwartz space is a space of functions on a semisimple Lie group whose derivatives are rapidly decreasing, studied by Harish-Chandra. It is an analogue of the Schwartz space on a real vector space, and is used to define the space of tempered distributions on a semisimple Lie group.

== Prerequisites ==
=== Length functions ===
Let $G$ be a topological group. A length on $G$ is a continuous function $l: G \mapsto [0, +\infty[$, such that for all $g, g' \in G$, $l(gg') \leq l(g) + l(g')$. These functions are used to define spaces with rapidly decreasing functions on locally compact topological groups, since they are used to define polynomial weights to ensure rapid decay.

=== The $\sigma$ function ===
Let $G$ be a semisimple connected Lie group with Lie algebra $\mathfrak{g}$, and let $K$ be its maximal compact subgroup. Then, the Cartan decomposition of $G$ allows one to state that the mapping $(k, X) \mapsto k \exp(X)$ ,$k \in K$ and $X \in \mathfrak{p}$ is an analytic diffeomorphism of $K \times \mathfrak{p}$ onto $G$.
Let $b$ be the Killing form of $\mathfrak{g}$. Its restriction on $\mathfrak{p}$ provides an euclidean norm $\| X \|$, $K$-invariant, and such that $\langle X, (adZ)^2Y \rangle = \langle (ad Z)^2X, Y \rangle$ for all $X, Y, Z \in \mathfrak{p}$, where $\langle \cdot, \cdot \rangle$ is the inner product corresponding to $\| \cdot \|$.
The $\sigma$ function of $G$ is then defined as $\sigma(x) = \| X \|$ for $x = k \exp(X)$. It is proved that $\sigma$ is a length function. Of course, $\sigma$ is equal to $0$ on $K$, and for all $x \in G$, $\sigma(x^{-1}) = \sigma(x)$.

== Definition ==
In order to define the Harish-Chandra Schwartz space on a semisimple Lie group $G$, one uses the Harish-Chandra's Ξ function and the $\sigma$ function of $G$, defined in the former section. The Schwartz space on $G$ consists roughly of the functions all of whose derivatives are rapidly decreasing compared to Ξ. More precisely, let's suppose $G$ is connected, and let's define $\nu_{r, g_1, g_2}(f) = \displaystyle \sup_{g \in G}{| g_1 \ast f(g) \ast g_2 | \Xi^{-1}(g)(1+\sigma(g))^r}$ for all $r \in \mathbb{R}$, where $g_1$ and $g_2$ belong to the universal enveloping algebra $U \mathfrak{g}$ of $\mathfrak{g}$, $\ast$ denotes its action on $G$ as differential operators, and $r \in \mathbb{R}$.
The Harish-Chandra Schwartz space is defined as the subspace $S(G)$ of $\mathcal{C}^\infty(G)$ such that $f \in S(G)$ if and only if $\nu_{r, g_1, g_2}(f) < +\infty$ for every $g_1, g_2 \in U \mathfrak{g}$, $r \in \mathbb{R}$. Topologized with the set of such seminorms, it is a Fréchet space. Since $G$ is connected, the set of smooth functions with compact support $\mathcal{C}_c^\infty(G)$ on $G$ is dense in $S(G)$.
