= Jantzen Knitting Mills Company Building =

Historic building in Portland, Oregon, U.S.

- U.S. National Register of Historic Places
- Portland Historic Landmark
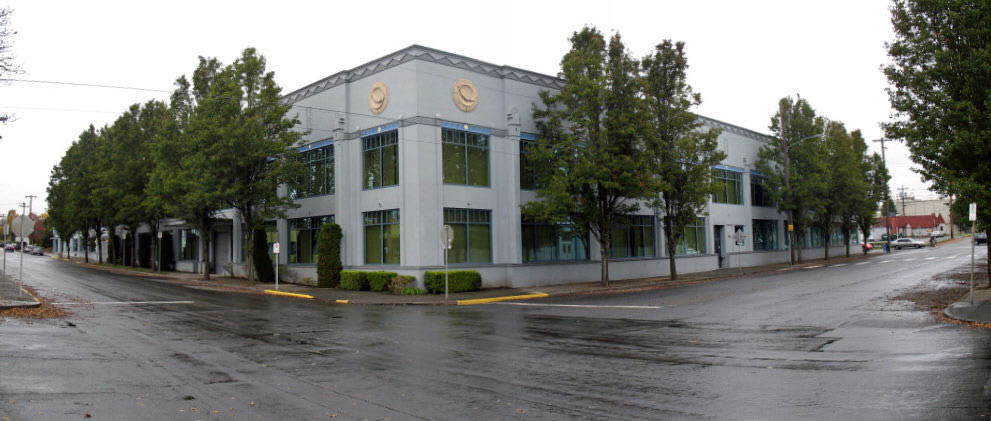

- Location within Portland, Oregon
- Location: 1935 NE Glisan Street; Portland, Oregon
- Coordinates: 45°31′38″N 122°38′46″W
- Area: 1.6 acres (0.65 ha)
- Built: 1929
- Architect: Sundeleaf, Richard W.; et al.
- Architectural style: Art Deco
- NRHP reference No.: 91000812
- Added to NRHP: June 24, 1991

The Jantzen Knitting Mills Company Building is a building located in northeast Portland, Oregon, USA, listed on the National Register of Historic Places. The picture is of the corner of 19th Ave. and NE Glisan St.

== See also ==
- National Register of Historic Places listings in Northeast Portland, Oregon
- Jantzen
