= Harish-Chandra homomorphism =

In mathematical representation theory, a Harish-Chandra homomorphism is a homomorphism from a subalgebra of the universal enveloping algebra of a semisimple Lie algebra to the universal enveloping algebra of a subalgebra. A particularly important special case is the Harish-Chandra isomorphism identifying the center of the universal enveloping algebra with the invariant polynomials on a Cartan subalgebra.

In the case of the K-invariant elements of the universal enveloping algebra for a maximal compact subgroup K, the Harish-Chandra homomorphism was studied by Harish-Chandra (1958).
