= Jens Carsten Jantzen =

German mathematician (born 1948)

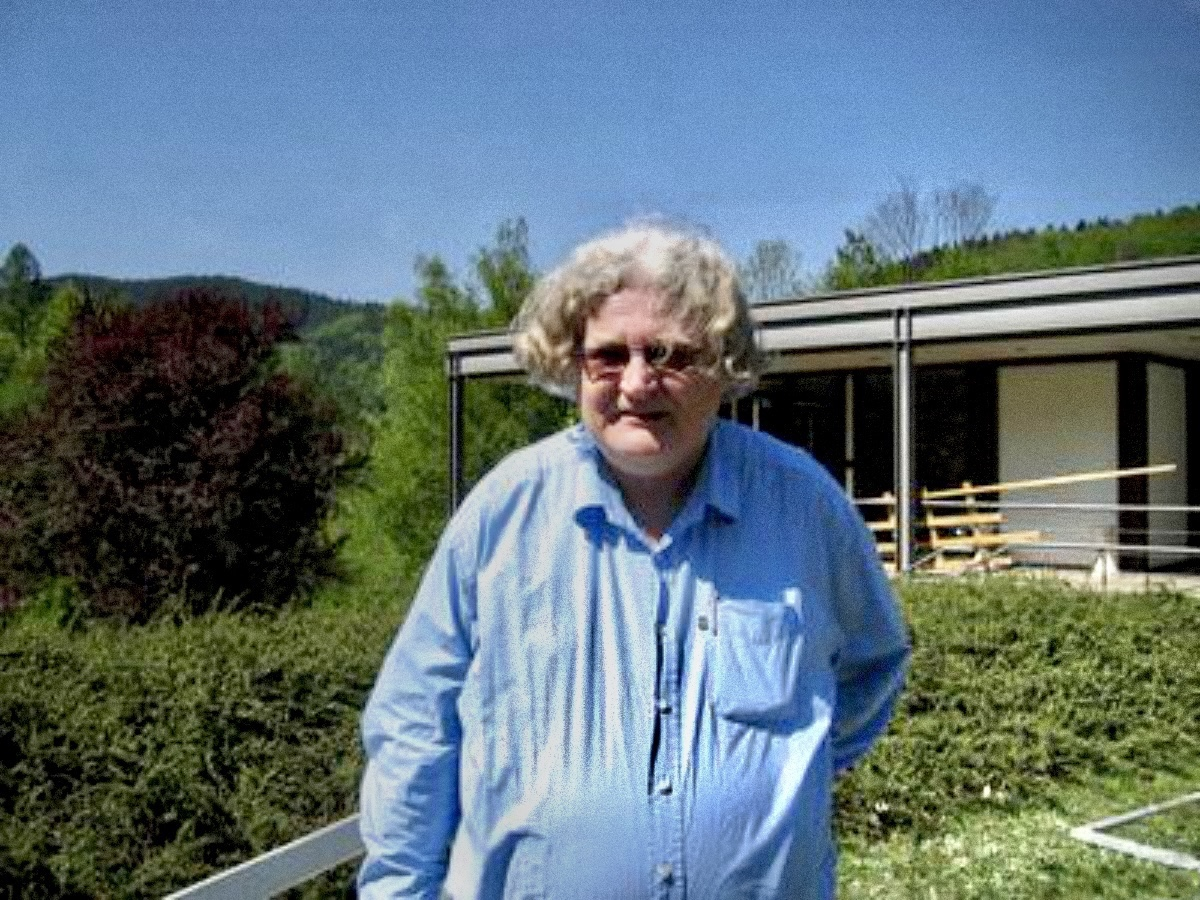
Jantzen at Oberwolfach, 2007

Jens Carsten Jantzen (born 1948) is a German mathematician and professor emeritus at Aarhus University working on representation theory and algebraic groups. He introduced the Jantzen filtration and translation functors.

== Early life and education ==
Jantzen was born in 1948 in Störtewerkerkoog, Nordfriesland. He received his PhD from the University of Bonn in 1973 under the supervision of Jacques Tits.

== Career ==
In the late 1970s, Jantzen and Gregg Zuckerman independently introduced translation functors. In 1979, he introduced the Jantzen filtration.

His doctoral students include Wolfgang Soergel.

== Awards and honors ==
In 2012 he became a fellow of the American Mathematical Society.

== Selected publications ==
- Jantzen, Jens Carsten (1979), Moduln mit einem höchsten Gewicht, Lecture Notes in Mathematics, vol. 750, Berlin, New York: Springer-Verlag, doi:10.1007/BFb0069521, ISBN 978-3-540-09558-3, MR 0552943
- Jantzen, Jens Carsten (1983), Einhüllende Algebren halbeinfacher Lie-Algebren, Ergebnisse der Mathematik und ihrer Grenzgebiete (3) [Results in Mathematics and Related Areas (3)] (in German), vol. 3, Berlin, New York: Springer-Verlag, ISBN 978-3-540-12178-7, MR 0721170
- Jantzen, Jens Carsten (1996), Lectures on quantum groups, Graduate Studies in Mathematics, vol. 6, Providence, R.I.: American Mathematical Society, ISBN 978-0-8218-0478-0, MR 1359532
- Jantzen, Jens Carsten (2003) [1987], Representations of algebraic groups, Mathematical Surveys and Monographs, vol. 107 (2nd ed.), Providence, R.I.: American Mathematical Society, ISBN 978-0-8218-3527-2, MR 2015057
- Jantzen, Jens Carsten; Schwermer, Joachim (2006), Algebra, Springer-Lehrbuch, Springer-Verlag, doi:10.1007/3-540-29287-X, ISBN 978-3-540-21380-2
- Borho, Walter; Jantzen, Jens Carsten (1977). "Über primitive Ideale in der Einhüllenden einer halbeinfachen Lie-Algebra". Inventiones Mathematicae. 39: 1–53. Bibcode:1977InMat..39....1B. doi:10.1007/bf01695950. S2CID 118474214.
