= Matrix coefficient =

Functions on special groups related to their matrix representations

In mathematics, a matrix coefficient (or matrix element) is a function on a group of a special form, which depends on a linear representation of the group and additional data. Precisely, it is a function on a compact topological group G obtained by composing a representation of G on a vector space V with a linear map from the endomorphisms of V into V's underlying field. It is also called a representative function. They arise naturally from finite-dimensional representations of G as the matrix-entry functions of the corresponding matrix representations. The Peter–Weyl theorem says that the matrix coefficients on G are dense in the Hilbert space of square-integrable functions on G.

Matrix coefficients of representations of Lie groups turned out to be intimately related with the theory of special functions, providing a unifying approach to large parts of this theory. Growth properties of matrix coefficients play a key role in the classification of irreducible representations of locally compact groups, in particular, reductive real and p-adic groups. The formalism of matrix coefficients leads to a generalization of the notion of a modular form. In a different direction, mixing properties of certain dynamical systems are controlled by the properties of suitable matrix coefficients.

== Definition ==
A matrix coefficient (or matrix element) of a linear representation ρ of a group G on a vector space V is a function f_{v,η} on the group, of the type

$$f_{v,\eta}(g) = \eta(\rho(g)v)$$

where v is a vector in V, η is a continuous linear functional on V, and g is an element of G. This function takes scalar values on G. If V is a Hilbert space, then by the Riesz representation theorem, all matrix coefficients have the form

$$f_{v,w}(g) = \langle \rho(g)v, w \rangle$$

for some vectors v and w in V.

For V of finite dimension, and v and w taken from a standard basis, this is actually the function given by the matrix entry in a fixed place.

== Applications ==
=== Finite groups ===
Matrix coefficients of irreducible representations of finite groups play a prominent role in representation theory of these groups, as developed by Burnside, Frobenius and Schur. They satisfy Schur orthogonality relations. The character of a representation ρ is a sum of the matrix coefficients f_{v_{i},η_{i}}, where {v_{i}} form a basis in the representation space of ρ, and {η_{i}} form the dual basis.

=== Finite-dimensional Lie groups and special functions ===
Matrix coefficients of representations of Lie groups were first considered by Élie Cartan. Israel Gelfand realized that many classical special functions and orthogonal polynomials are expressible as the matrix coefficients of representation of Lie groups G. This description provides a uniform framework for proving many hitherto disparate properties of special functions, such as addition formulas, certain recurrence relations, orthogonality relations, integral representations, and eigenvalue properties with respect to differential operators. Special functions of mathematical physics, such as the trigonometric functions, the hypergeometric function and its generalizations, Legendre and Jacobi orthogonal polynomials and Bessel functions all arise as matrix coefficients of representations of Lie groups. Theta functions and real analytic Eisenstein series, important in algebraic geometry and number theory, also admit such realizations.

=== Automorphic forms ===
A powerful approach to the theory of classical modular forms, initiated by Gelfand, Graev, and Piatetski-Shapiro, views them as matrix coefficients of certain infinite-dimensional unitary representations, automorphic representations of adelic groups. This approach was further developed by Langlands, for general reductive algebraic groups over global fields.

== See also ==
- Peter–Weyl theorem
- Spherical functions
- Discrete series representation
