= Infinitesimal character =

In mathematics, the infinitesimal character of an irreducible representation $\rho$ of a semisimple Lie group $G$ on a vector space $V$ is, roughly speaking, a mapping to scalars that encodes the process of first differentiating and then diagonalizing the representation. It therefore is a way of extracting something essential from the representation $\rho$ by two successive linearizations.

== Formulation ==
The infinitesimal character is the linear form on the center $Z$ of the universal enveloping algebra of the Lie algebra of $G$ that the representation induces. This construction relies on some extended version of Schur's lemma to show that any $z$ in $Z$ acts on $V$ as a scalar, which by abuse of notation could be written $\rho (z)$.

In more classical language, $z$ is a differential operator, constructed from the infinitesimal transformations which are induced on $V$ by the Lie algebra of $G$. The effect of Schur's lemma is to force all $v$ in $V$ to be simultaneous eigenvectors of $z$ acting on $V$. Calling the corresponding eigenvalue:

$$\lambda = \lambda (z)$$

the infinitesimal character is by definition the mapping:

$$z \rightarrow \lambda (z)$$

There is scope for further formulation. By the Harish-Chandra isomorphism, the center $Z$ can be identified with the subalgebra of elements of the symmetric algebra of the Cartan subalgebra a that are invariant under the Weyl group, so an infinitesimal character can be identified with an element of:

$$a^* \otimes C / W$$

the orbits under the Weyl group $W$ of the space $a^* \otimes C$ of complex linear functions on the Cartan subalgebra.

== See also ==
- Harish-Chandra isomorphism
