= Harish-Chandra's regularity theorem =

In mathematics, Harish-Chandra's regularity theorem, introduced by Harish-Chandra (1963), states that every invariant eigendistribution on a semisimple Lie group, and in particular every character of an irreducible unitary representation on a Hilbert space, is given by a locally integrable function. Harish-Chandra (1978, 1999) proved a similar theorem for semisimple p-adic groups.

Harish-Chandra (1955, 1956) had previously shown that any invariant eigendistribution is analytic on the regular elements of the group, by showing that on these elements it is a solution of an elliptic differential equation. The problem is that it may have singularities on the singular elements of the group; the regularity theorem implies that these singularities are not too severe.

== Statement ==
A distribution on a group G or its Lie algebra is called invariant if it is invariant under conjugation by G.

A distribution on a group G or its Lie algebra is called an eigendistribution if it is an eigenvector of the center of the universal enveloping algebra of G (identified with the left and right invariant differential operators of G).

Harish-Chandra's regularity theorem states that any invariant eigendistribution on a semisimple group or Lie algebra is a locally integrable function. The condition that it is an eigendistribution can be relaxed slightly to the condition that its image under the center of the universal enveloping algebra is finite-dimensional. The regularity theorem also implies that on each Cartan subalgebra the distribution can be written as a finite sum of exponentials divided by a function Δ that closely resembles the denominator of the Weyl character formula.

== Proof ==
Harish-Chandra's original proof of the regularity theorem is given in a sequence of five papers (Harish-Chandra 1964a, 1964b, 1964c, 1965a, 1965b). Atiyah (1988) gave an exposition of the proof of Harish-Chandra's regularity theorem for the case of SL_{2}(R), and sketched its generalization to higher rank groups.

Most proofs can be broken up into several steps as follows.

- Step 1. If Θ is an invariant eigendistribution then it is analytic on the regular elements of G. This follows from elliptic regularity, by showing that the center of the universal enveloping algebra has an element that is "elliptic transverse to an orbit of G" for any regular orbit.
- Step 2. If Θ is an invariant eigendistribution then its restriction to the regular elements of G is locally integrable on G. (This makes sense as the non-regular elements of G have measure zero.) This follows by showing that ΔΘ on each Cartan subalgebra is a finite sum of exponentials, where Δ is essentially the denominator of the Weyl denominator formula, with 1/Δ locally integrable.
- Step 3. By steps 1 and 2, the invariant eigendistribution Θ is a sum S+F where F is a locally integrable function and S has support on the singular elements of G. The problem is to show that S vanishes. This is done by stratifying the set of singular elements of G as a union of locally closed submanifolds of G and using induction on the codimension of the strata. While it is possible for an eigenfunction of a differential equation to be of the form S+F with F locally integrable and S having singular support on a submanifold, this is only possible if the differential operator satisfies some restrictive conditions. One can then check that the Casimir operator of G does not satisfy these conditions on the strata of the singular set, which forces S to vanish.
