= Simon Gindikin =

Russian mathematician (born 1937)

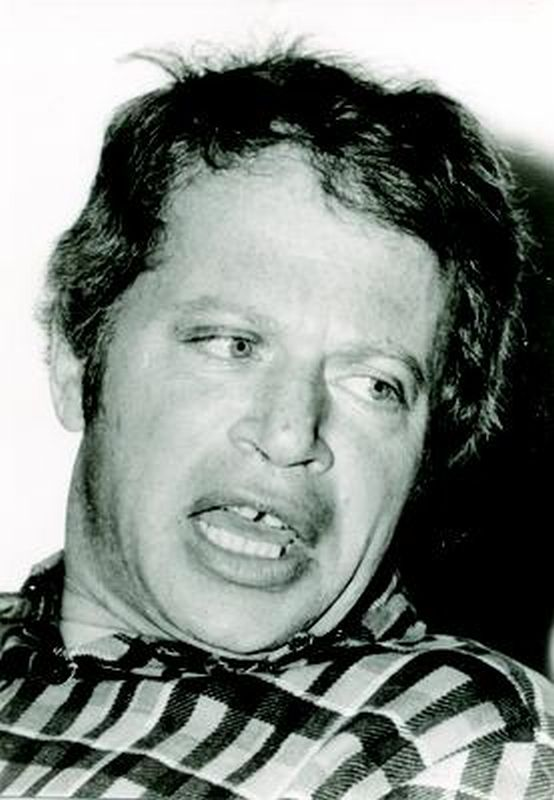
Simon Gindikin (1984)

Simon Grigorevich Gindikin (Russian: Семён Григорьевич Гиндикин; born 7 December 1937, Moscow, Russian SFSR) is a mathematician at Rutgers University who introduced the Gindikin–Karpelevich formula for the Harish-Chandra c-function.

== Publications ==
- Gindikin, S. G.; Karpelevich, F. I. (1962), "Plancherel measure for symmetric Riemannian spaces of non-positive curvature", Soviet Math. Dokl., 3: 962–965, ISSN 0002-3264, MR 0150239
- Gindikin, S. G.; Karpelevich, F. I. (1969) [1966], "On an integral associated with Riemannian symmetric spaces of non-positive curvature", Twelve Papers on Functional Analysis and Geometry, American Mathematical Society translations, vol. 85, pp. 249–258, ISBN 978-0-8218-1785-8, MR 0222219
- Gindikin, Simon (2007) [1981], Tales of mathematicians and physicists (2nd ed.), Berlin, New York: Springer-Verlag, doi:10.1007/978-0-387-48811-0, ISBN 978-0-387-36026-3, MR 0652688
