= Blattner's conjecture =

In mathematics, Blattner's conjecture or Blattner's formula is a description of the discrete series representations of a general semisimple group G in terms of their restricted representations to a maximal compact subgroup K (their so-called K-types). It is named after Robert James Blattner, despite not being formulated as a conjecture by him.

== Statement ==
Blattner's formula says that if a discrete series representation with infinitesimal character λ is restricted to a maximal compact subgroup K, then the representation of K with highest weight μ occurs with multiplicity

$$\sum_{w\in W_K}\epsilon(\omega)Q(w(\mu+\rho_c)-\lambda-\rho_n)$$

where

Q is the number of ways a vector can be written as a sum of non-compact positive roots
W_{K} is the Weyl group of K
ρ_{c} is half the sum of the compact roots
ρ_{n} is half the sum of the non-compact roots
ε is the sign character of W_{K}.

Blattner's formula is what one gets by formally restricting the Harish-Chandra character formula for a discrete series representation to the maximal torus of a maximal compact group. The problem in proving the Blattner formula is that this only gives the character on the regular elements of the maximal torus, and one also needs to control its behavior on the singular elements. For non-discrete irreducible representations the formal restriction of Harish-Chandra's character formula need not give the decomposition under the maximal compact subgroup: for example, for the principal series representations of SL_{2} the character is identically zero on the non-singular elements of the maximal compact subgroup, but the representation is not zero on this subgroup. In this case the character is a distribution on the maximal compact subgroup with support on the singular elements.

== History ==
Harish-Chandra orally attributed the conjecture to Robert James Blattner as a question Blattner raised, not a conjecture made by Blattner. Blattner did not publish it in any form. It first appeared in print in Schmid (1968, theorem 2), where it was first referred to as "Blattner's Conjecture," despite the results of that paper having been obtained without knowledge of Blattner's question and notwithstanding Blattner's not having made such a conjecture. Okamoto & Ozeki (1967) mentioned a special case of it slightly earlier.

Schmid (1975a) showed that Blattner's formula gave an upper bound for the multiplicities of K-representations, Schmid (1975b) proved Blattner's conjecture for groups whose symmetric space is Hermitian, and Hecht & Schmid (1975) proved Blattner's conjecture for linear semisimple groups. Blattner's conjecture (formula) was also proved by Enright (1979) by infinitesimal methods which were totally new and completely different from those of Hecht and Schmid (1975). Part of the impetus for Enright’s paper (1979) came from several sources: from Enright & Varadarajan (1975), Wallach (1976), Enright & Wallach (1978). In Enright (1979) multiplicity formulae are given for the so-called mock-discrete series representations also. Enright (1978) used his ideas to obtain results on the construction and classification of irreducible Harish-Chandra modules of any real semisimple Lie algebra.
