= Harish-Chandra's Ξ function =

In mathematics, specifically harmonic analysis, Harish-Chandra's Ξ function is a special spherical function on a semisimple Lie group. It was introduced by Harish-Chandra, who used it to define his Schwartz space.

For $K$ a maximal compact subgroup of a semisimple Lie group with Iwasawa decomposition $G=NAK$, $g$ an element of $G$, $a(g)$ the element $a$ in the Iwasawa decomposition $g=nak$ and $\rho$ a Weyl vector, the $\Xi$ function is defined as

$$\Xi(g)=\int_Ka(kg)^\rho dk$$.

Wallach gives a detailed description of the properties of $\Xi$.
