= Stephan Jantzen (icebreaker) =

Icebreaker built in 1967

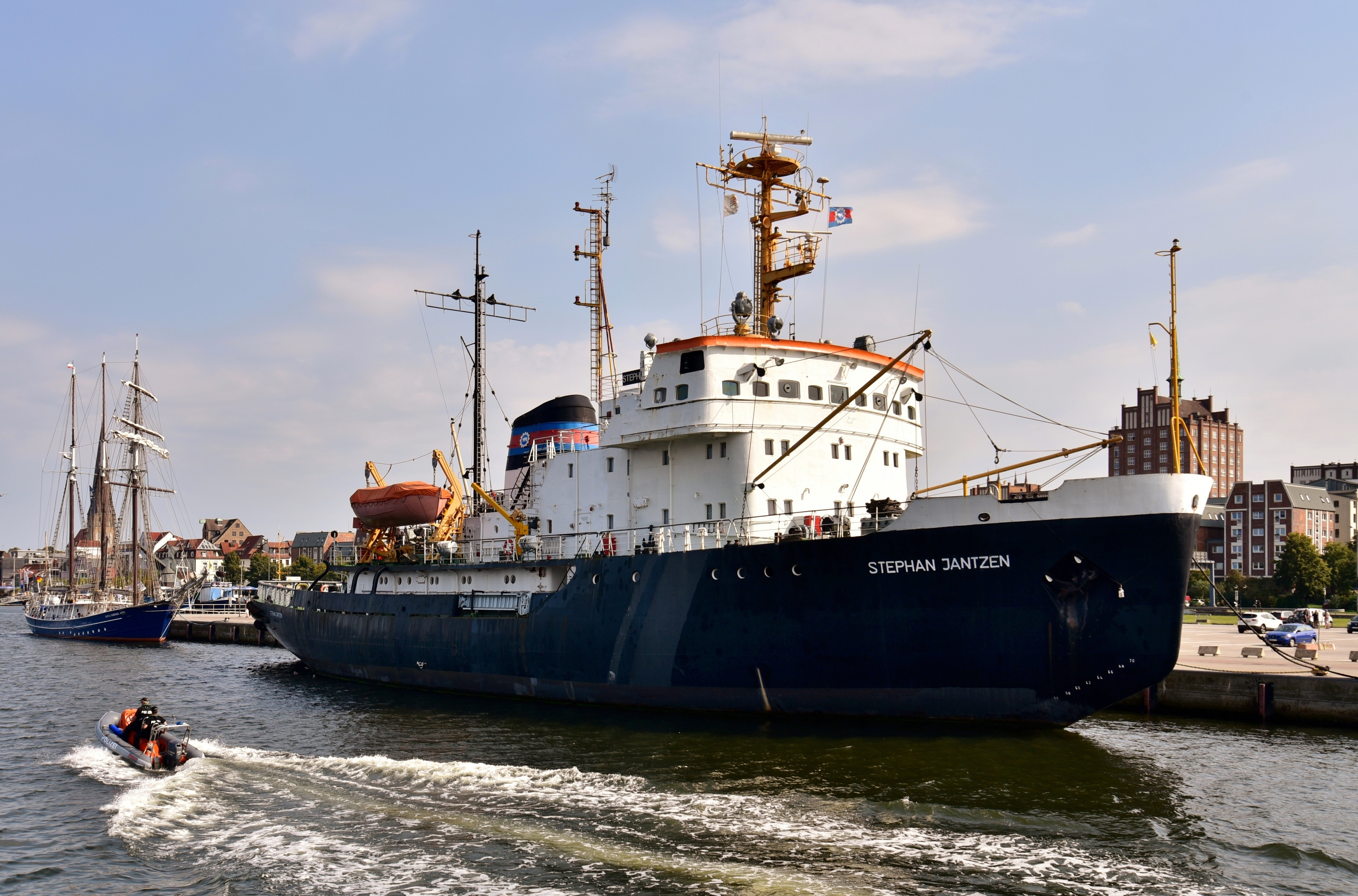
- Stephan Jantzen as a museum ship in Rostock in 2019

History

→ GDR → Germany
- Name: Stephan Jantzen (1990–2005); Various (2005–2013); Stephan Jantzen (2013–present)
- Namesake: Stephan Jantzen
- Owner: Bagger-, Bugsier- und Bergungsreederei Rostock (BBB) (1967–1990); Wasser- und Schifffahrtsamt Stralsund (1990–2005); Various (2005–2018); City of Rostock (2018–present)
- Port of registry: Rostock, GDR → Germany (1967–1990); Stralsund, Germany (1990–2005); Various (2005–2018); Rostock, Germany (2018–present)
- Builder: Admiralty Shipyard (Leningrad, USSR)
- Yard number: 775
- Laid down: 15 September 1966
- Launched: 30 December 1966
- Completed: 30 November 1967
- In service: 1967–2005
- Identification: IMO number: 7117486
- Status: Museum ship

General characteristics
- Class & type: Dobrynya Nikitich-class icebreaker
- Length: 67.64 m (222 ft)
- Beam: 18.28 m (60 ft)
- Draught: 5.64 metres (18.5 ft) (maximum)
- Installed power: 3 × 13D100 (3 × 1,800 hp)
- Propulsion: Diesel–electric; three shafts (2 × 2,400 hp + 1,600 hp)
- Speed: 14.6 knots (27.0 km/h; 16.8 mph) (maximum)
- Range: 6,000 nautical miles (11,000 km; 6,900 mi) at 12 knots (22 km/h; 14 mph)
- Endurance: 14 days
- Crew: 17 crew; Accommodation for 30

Stephan Jantzen is a former German icebreaker built by Admiralty Shipyard in Leningrad, Soviet Union, in 1967. After decommissioning in 2005, the ship went through a number of owners before ending up as a museum ship in its former homeport, Rostock.

== Description ==
In the mid-1950s, the Soviet Union began developing a new diesel-electric icebreaker design based on the 1942-built former Kriegsmarine steam-powered icebreaker Eisbär to meet the needs of both civilian and naval operators. Built in various configurations until the early 1980s, the Project 97 icebreakers and their derivatives became the largest and longest-running class of icebreakers and icebreaking vessels built in the world. The single-vessel subclass Project 97E, an icebreaker built for East Germany, was practically identical to the unarmed icebreakers built for the Ministry of the Maritime Fleet of the Soviet Union with the exception of a significantly smaller crew of 17 working with two-week rotation.

Stephan Jantzen is 67.64 metres (222 ft) long overall and has a beam of 18.28 metres (60 ft) and maximum draught of 5.64 metres (19 ft). The ship's diesel-electric power plant consists of three 1,800-horsepower (1,300 kW) 10-cylinder 13D100 two-stroke opposed-piston diesel engines coupled to double-armature direct current (DC) generators. They provided power to 2,500 hp (1,900 kW) electric propulsion motors driving two 3.5-metre (11 ft) fixed pitch propellers in the stern and a third motor rated at 1,600 hp (1,200 kW) driving a 2.7-metre (9 ft) propeller in the bow. The ship's 60-tonne-force (590 kN) bollard pull would allow towing a 200,000-tonne tanker at a speed of 3 knots (5.6 km/h; 3.5 mph) and breaking 70 to 75 centimetres (28 to 30 in) thick snow-covered ice at very slow but continuous speed.

== History ==
=== 1967–2005 ===
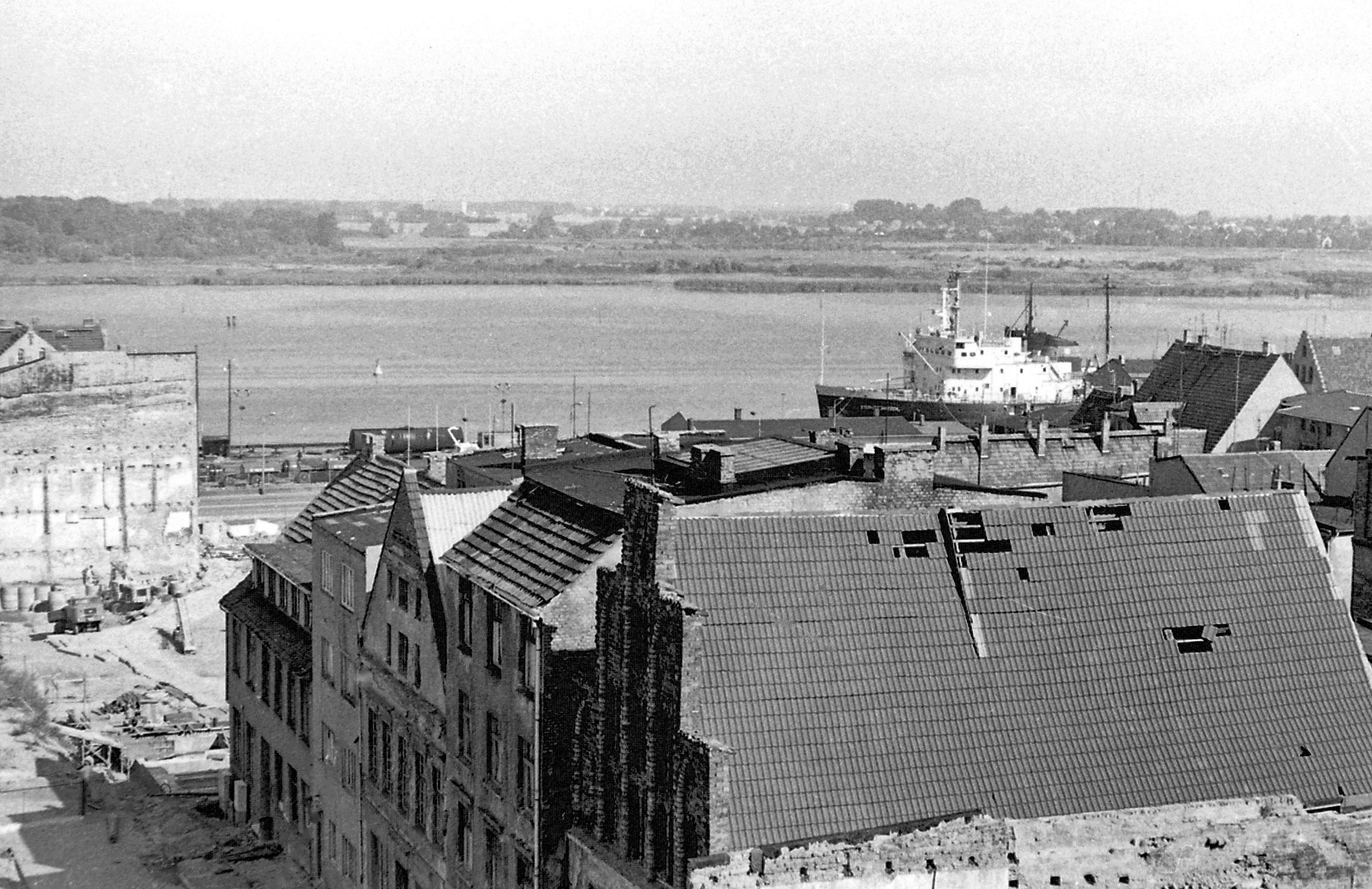
Stephan Jantzen in Rostock in 1980

Stephan Jantzen was laid down at Admiralty Shipyard in Leningrad on 15 September 1966, launched on 30 December 1966, and delivered on 30 November 1967. The ship was named after Stephan Jantzen (1827–1913), a famous German captain, harbour pilot and first commander of the German Maritime Search and Rescue Service station in Warnemünde.

Stephan Jantzen was operated by the state-owned shipping company Bagger-, Bugsier- und Bergungsreederei Rostock (BBB) until the German reunification in 1990 and Wasser- und Schifffahrtsamt Stralsund until the ship's decommissioning. Although built as an icebreaker, Stephan Jantzen was regularly used for all kinds of rescue, salvage and towing operations. In April–May 1976, it towed the 210,000-tonne crude oil tanker Metula from Brunsbüttel to Santander, Spain, for scrapping.

Having earned the nickname "Iron Pig" (German: Eisenschwein) over its 38-year service, Stephan Jantzen was replaced in 2005 by the icebreaking multipurpose vessel Arkona.

=== 2005–2018 ===
After decommissioning, the ship's name was shortened to Stephan and the German state put the icebreaker for sale in an online auction through the federal disposal sales and marketing agency VEBEG. The winning 430,000 euro bid was submitted by Beta Mar Limited, a shipping company registered in Greece, but the buyer never collected the vessel and forfeited the 40,000 euro downpayment.

In 2006, the icebreaker was acquired by the New York City-based businessman Paolo Zampolli who purchased it from the German state with the intention of rebuilding it to a luxury yacht for private voyages to the Arctic and the Antarctic. Although the vessel was reportedly reflagged to Saint Vincent and the Grenadines, official records indicate that it was instead registered in Panama under the name King Ice. The icebreaker remained docked in Stralsund as the owner was reportedly unable to find a suitable shipyard to carry out the conversion work. The ship's name was changed back to the original sometime in 2008. In February 2009, a Florida-based yacht broker offered Stephan Jantzen for sale for $3.5 million (2.8 million euro).

In July 2009, Stephan Jantzen was evicted from Stralsund for blocking the berth and towed to Rostock. The owner made an agreement with a newly-established non-profit association, Interessengemeinschaft Eisbrecher Stephan Jantzen ("Icebreaker Stephan Jantzen Interest Group"), for maintaining the vessel and offering tours to visitors.

In July 2012, Zampolli gave the association a week's notice to vacate Stephan Jantzen as the icebreaker would be leaving Rostock for conversion to a research ship. The ship was then reportedly sold to Kai Gunther Lehmann who registered it as a yacht in the Regensburg district court under the name König Ludwig II Von Bayern. However, the change of ownership was disputed and the Heidelberg district court ruled in favor of Zampolli in 2015.

In May 2016, the Rostock district court seized Stephan Jantzen due to outstanding berthing and security fees. Over the years, the icebreaker had suffered from vandalism and lack of maintenance, and the non-profit association that had previously maintained the vessel (now renamed Technische Flotte Rostock; "Rostock Technical Fleet") first guarded the ship on a volunteer basis and later under contract with the city of Rostock.

In 2018, the city of Rostock acquired the ship in a compulsory auction for 25,000 euro. A higher bid submitted on behalf of Zampolli was not accepted.

=== 2018 onwards ===
After acquiring Stephan Jantzen, the city of Rostock entrusted the icebreaker in care of the non-profit association Technische Flotte Rostock who opened it to the public as a museum ship after extensive clean-up on the 30th Hanseatic Day in June 2018 and have continued restoring the vessel since.
