= K-finite =

In mathematics, a K-finite function is a type of generalized trigonometric polynomial. Here K is some compact group, and the generalization is from the circle group T.

From an abstract point of view, the characterization of trigonometric polynomials amongst other functions F, in the harmonic analysis of the circle, is that for functions F in any of the typical function spaces, F is a trigonometric polynomial if and only if its Fourier coefficients

a_{n}

vanish for |n| large enough, and that this in turn is equivalent to the statement that all the translates

F(t + θ)

by a fixed angle θ lie in a finite-dimensional subspace. One implication here is trivial, and the other, starting from a finite-dimensional invariant subspace, follows from complete reducibility of representations of T.

From this formulation, the general definition can be seen: for a representation ρ of K on a vector space V, a K-finite vector v in V is one for which the

ρ(k).v

for k in K span a finite-dimensional subspace. The union of all finite-dimension K-invariant subspaces is itself a subspace, and K-invariant, and consists of all the K-finite vectors. When all v are K-finite, the representation ρ itself is called K-finite.
