= Harish-Chandra =

Indian-American mathematician (1923–1983)

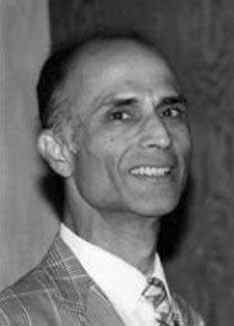
- Born: 11 October 1923; Kanpur, India
- Died: 16 October 1983 (aged 60); Princeton, New Jersey, United States
- Citizenship: United States
- Education: University of Allahabad; University of Cambridge
- Known for: Harish-Chandra's c-function; Harish-Chandra's character formula; Harish-Chandra homomorphism Harish-Chandra isomorphism; Harish-Chandra integral; Harish-Chandra module; Harish-Chandra's regularity theorem; Harish-Chandra's Schwartz space; Harish-Chandra transform; Harish-Chandra's Ξ function; Philosophy of cusp forms
- Awards: Fellow of the Royal Society; Cole Prize in Algebra (1954); Srinivasa Ramanujan Medal
- Scientific career
- Fields: Mathematics, Physics
- Workplaces: Indian Institute of Science; Harvard University; Columbia University; Tata Institute of Fundamental Research; Institute for Advanced Study

Harish-Chandra (né Harishchandra) FRS (11 October 1923 – 16 October 1983) was an Indian-American mathematician and physicist who did fundamental work in representation theory, especially harmonic analysis on semisimple Lie groups.

== Early life ==
Harish-Chandra was born in Kanpur. He was educated at B.N.S.D. College, Kanpur and at the University of Allahabad. After receiving his master's degree in physics in 1940, he moved to the Indian Institute of Science, Bangalore for further studies under Homi J. Bhabha.

In 1945, he moved to University of Cambridge, and worked as a research student under Paul Dirac. While at Cambridge, he attended lectures by Wolfgang Pauli, and during one of them, Harish-Chandra pointed out a mistake in Pauli's work. The two became lifelong friends. During this time he became increasingly interested in mathematics. He obtained his PhD, Infinite Irreducible Representations of the Lorentz Group, at Cambridge in 1947 under Dirac.

== Honors and awards ==
He was a member of the National Academy of Sciences and a Fellow of the Royal Society. He was the recipient of the Cole Prize of the American Mathematical Society, in 1954. The Indian National Science Academy honoured him with the Srinivasa Ramanujan Medal in 1974. In 1981, he received an honorary degree from Yale University.

The mathematics department of V.S.S.D. College, Kanpur celebrates his birthday every year in different forms, which includes lectures from students and professors from various colleges, institutes and students' visit to Harish-Chandra Research Institute.

The Indian Government named the Harish-Chandra Research Institute, an institute dedicated to Theoretical Physics and Mathematics, after him.

Robert Langlands wrote in a biographical article of Harish-Chandra:

He was considered for the Fields Medal in 1958, but a forceful member of the selection committee in whose eyes Thom was a Bourbakist was determined not to have two. So Harish-Chandra, whom he also placed on the Bourbaki camp, was set aside.

He was also a recipient of the Padma Bhushan in 1977.

== Personal life ==
In 1952, Harish-Chandra married Lalitha "Lily" Kale (1934–2019). Kale, whose father was an Indian food scientist and whose mother was a Polish Jew, was born in Warsaw but grew up in Bangalore after her family fled Poland in 1939 or 1940. They had two daughters, Premala Chandra and Devika Chandra; Premala also became a physicist.

== Death ==
Starting in 1969, Harish-Chandra began to experience heart attacks. A second and third heart attack occurred in 1970 and 1982, respectively. From then, his physical capabilities began to decline. A fourth heart attack occurred in 1983, leaving him mostly bedridden and in isolation. On the day after a conference organized for him and mathematician Armand Borel took place, Harish-Chandra died from his final heart attack.

== Publications ==
- Harish-Chandra (1968), Mars, J. G. M. (ed.), Automorphic Forms on Semisimple Lie Groups, Lecture Notes in Mathematics, vol. 62, Berlin, New York: Springer-Verlag, doi:10.1007/BFb0098434, ISBN 978-3-540-04232-7, MR 0232893, S2CID 118891017
- Harish-Chandra (1970), Dijk, G. van (ed.), Harmonic Analysis on Reductive p-adic Groups, Lecture Notes in Mathematics, vol. 162, Berlin, New York: Springer-Verlag, doi:10.1007/BFb0061269, ISBN 978-3-540-05189-3, MR 0414797
- Harish-Chandra (1984), Varadarajan, V. S. (ed.), Collected papers. Vol. I. 1944–1954., Berlin, New York: Springer-Verlag, ISBN 978-0-387-90782-6, MR 0726025
- Harish-Chandra (1984), Varadarajan, V. S. (ed.), Collected papers. Vol. II 1955–1958., Berlin, New York: Springer-Verlag, ISBN 978-0-387-90782-6, MR 0726025
- Harish-Chandra (1984), Varadarajan, V. S. (ed.), Collected papers. Vol. III 1959–1968., Berlin, New York: Springer-Verlag, ISBN 978-0-387-90782-6, MR 0726025
- Harish-Chandra (1984), Varadarajan, V. S. (ed.), Collected papers. Vol. IV 1970–1983., Berlin, New York: Springer-Verlag, ISBN 978-0-387-90782-6, MR 0726025
- Harish-Chandra (1999), DeBacker, Stephen; Sally, Paul J. (eds.), Admissible invariant distributions on reductive p-adic groups, University Lecture Series, vol. 16, Providence, R.I.: American Mathematical Society, doi:10.1090/ulect/016, ISBN 978-0-8218-2025-4, MR 1702257

== Bibliography ==
- Doran, Robert S.; Varadarajan, V. S., eds. (2000), "The mathematical legacy of Harish-Chandra", Proceedings of the AMS Special Session on Representation Theory and Noncommutative Harmonic Analysis, held in memory of Harish-Chandra on the occasion of the 75th anniversary of his birth, in Baltimore, MD, January 9–10, 1998, Proceedings of Symposia in Pure Mathematics, vol. 68, Providence, R.I.: American Mathematical Society, pp. xii+551, doi:10.1090/pspum/068, ISBN 978-0-8218-1197-9, MR 1767886
- Srivastava, R. S. L. (1986), "About Harish Chandra", Gaṇita Bhãrati. Indian Society for History of Mathematics. Bulletin, 8 (1): 42–43, ISSN 0970-0307, MR 0888666
- Varadarajan, V. S. (2003), "Harish-Chandra", Complete Dictionary of Scientific Biography
