= Modulo (disambiguation) =

Modulo is the remainder operation, which carries out a division operation with a remainder as result.

Modulo may also refer to:

== Mathematics and computer science ==
- Modulo (mathematics), a word with multiple distinct meanings in mathematics
  - Modular arithmetic, a part of a system of arithmetic for integers, where numbers "wrap around" upon reaching a certain value—the modulus

== Other uses ==
- Módulo, a Brazilian company specializing in IT governance
- Ferrari Modulo, a concept car from 1970
- Jujutsu Kaisen Modulo, a Japanese manga series

== See also ==
- Modulus (disambiguation)
- Module (disambiguation)
- Mod (disambiguation)
