= Date of Easter =

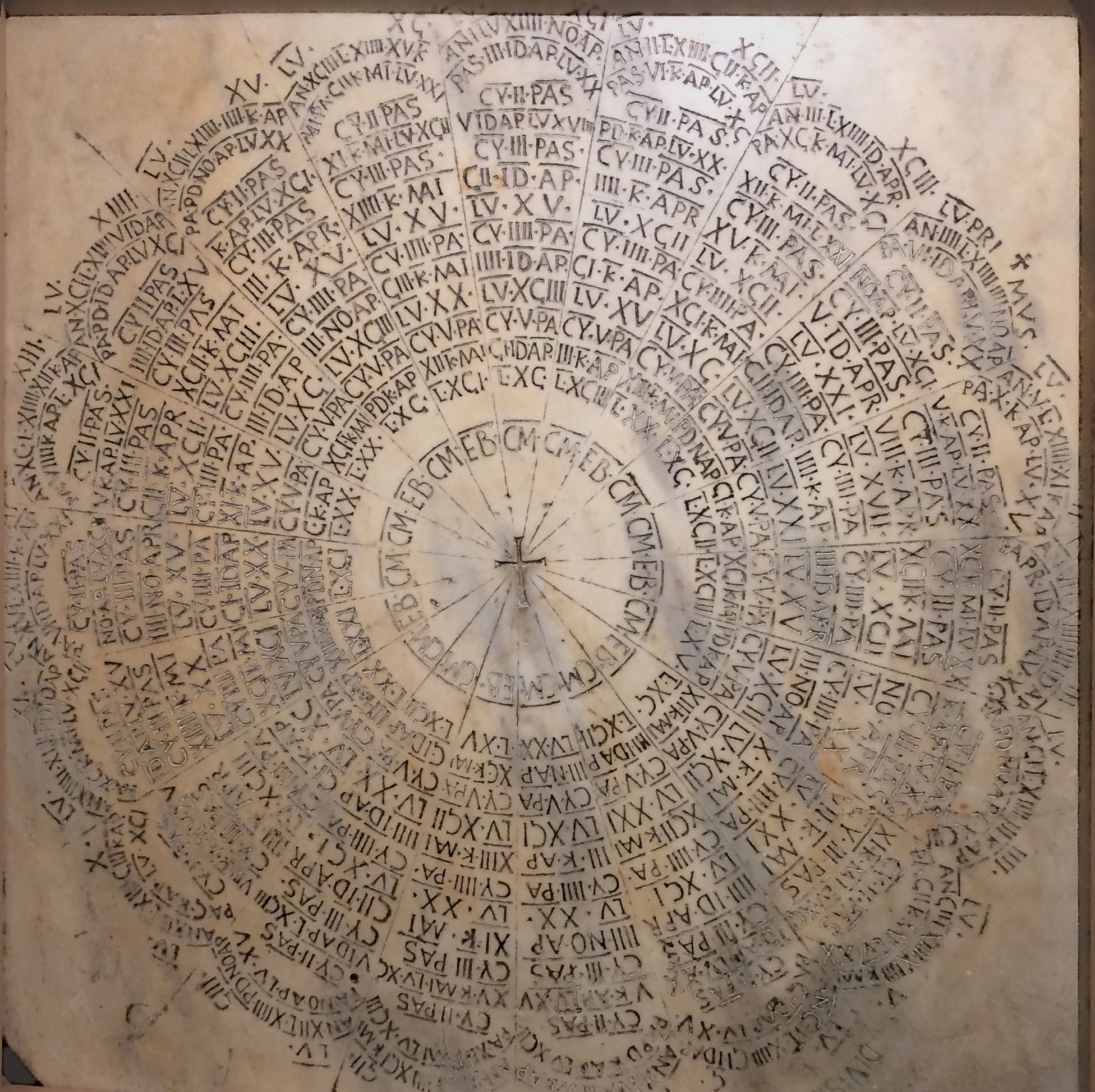
A calendar of the dates of Easter, for the 95 years 532–626, marble, in the Museum of Ravenna Cathedral, Italy. Five 19-year cycles are represented as concentric circles. Dates are given using the system of the Roman calendar, as well as the day of the lunar month.

As a moveable feast, the date of Easter is determined in each year through a calculation known as computus paschalis (Latin for 'Easter computation') – often simply Computus – or as paschalion particularly in the Eastern Orthodox Church. Easter is celebrated on the first Sunday after the Paschal full moon (a mathematical approximation of the first astronomical full moon, on or after 21 March – itself a fixed approximation of the March equinox). Determining this date in advance requires a correlation between the lunar months and the solar year, while also accounting for the month, date, and weekday of the Julian or Gregorian calendar. The complexity of the algorithm arises because of the desire to associate the date of Easter with the date of the Jewish feast of Passover which, Christians believe, is when Jesus was crucified.

It was originally feasible for the entire Christian Church to receive the date of Easter each year through an annual announcement by the pope. By the early third century, however, communications in the Roman Empire had deteriorated to the point that the church put great value in a system that would allow the clergy to determine the date for themselves, independently yet consistently. Additionally, the church wished to eliminate dependencies on the Hebrew calendar, by deriving the date for Easter directly from the March equinox.

In The Reckoning of Time (725), Bede uses computus as a general term for any sort of calculation, although he refers to the Easter cycles of Theophilus as a "Paschal computus." By the end of the 8th century, computus came to refer specifically to the calculation of time. The calculations produce different results depending on whether the Julian calendar or the Gregorian calendar is used. For this reason, the Catholic Church and Protestant churches (which follow the Gregorian calendar) celebrate Easter on a different date from that of the Eastern and Oriental Orthodoxy (which follow the Julian calendar). It was the drift of 21 March from the observed equinox that led to the Gregorian reform of the calendar, to bring them back into line.

== History ==
=== Early Roman tables and the development of the Dionysian tables ===
The earliest known Roman tables were devised in 222 by Hippolytus of Rome based on eight-year cycles. Then 84-year tables were introduced in Rome by Augustalis near the end of the 3rd century. (Note: Although this is the dating of Augustalis by Bruno Krusch, see arguments for a 5th century date in Mosshammer 2008, pp. 217, 227–228.) Although a process based on the 19-year Metonic cycle was first proposed by Bishop Anatolius of Laodicea around 277, the concept did not fully take hold until the Alexandrian method became authoritative in the late 4th century. (Note: The lunar cycle of Anatolius, according to the tables in De ratione paschali, included only two bissextile (leap) years every 19 years, so could not be used by anyone using the Julian calendar, which had four or five leap years per lunar cycle.)

The Alexandrian computus was converted from the Alexandrian calendar into the Julian calendar in Alexandria around 440, which resulted in a Paschal table (attributed to Pope Cyril of Alexandria) covering the years 437 to 531. This Paschal table was the source that inspired Dionysius Exiguus, who worked in Rome from about 500 to about 540, to construct a continuation of it in the form of his famous Paschal table covering the years 532 to 616. Dionysius introduced the Christian Era (counting years from the Incarnation of Christ) by publishing this new Easter table in 525. (Note: For confirmation of Dionysius's role see Blackburn & Holford-Strevens 1999, p. 794.)

A modified 84-year cycle was adopted in Rome during the first half of the 4th century. Victorius of Aquitaine tried to adapt the Alexandrian method to Roman rules in 457 in the form of a 532-year table, but he introduced serious errors. These Victorian tables were used in Gaul (now France) and Spain until they were displaced by Dionysian tables at the end of the 8th century.

The tables of Dionysius and Victorius conflicted with those traditionally used in the British Isles. The British tables used an 84-year cycle, but an error made the full moons fall progressively too early. The discrepancy led to a report that Queen Eanflæd, on the Dionysian system – fasted on her Palm Sunday while her husband Oswiu, king of Northumbria, feasted on his Easter Sunday.

As a result of the Irish Synod of Magh-Lene in 630, the southern Irish began to use the Dionysian tables, and the northern English followed suit after the Synod of Whitby in 664.

The Dionysian reckoning was fully described by Bede in 725. It may have been adopted by Charlemagne for the Frankish Church as early as 782 from Alcuin, a follower of Bede. The Dionysian/Bedan computus remained in use in western Europe until the Gregorian calendar reform, and remains in use in most Eastern Churches, including the vast majority of Eastern Orthodox Churches and Non-Chalcedonian Churches. The only Eastern Orthodox church which does not follow the system is the Finnish Orthodox Church, which uses the Gregorian.

Having deviated from the Alexandrians during the 6th century, churches beyond the eastern frontier of the former Byzantine Empire, including the Assyrian Church of the East, now celebrate Easter on different dates from Eastern Orthodox Churches four times every 532 years.

=== Gregorian Calendar ===
Apart from these churches on the eastern fringes of the Roman empire, by the tenth century all had adopted the Alexandrian Easter, which still placed the vernal equinox on 21 March, although Bede had already noted its drift in 725 – it had drifted even further by the 16th century. (Note: For example, in the Julian calendar, at Rome in 1550, the March equinox occurred on 11 March at 6:51 a.m. local mean time.) Worse, the reckoned Moon that was used to compute Easter was fixed to the Julian year by the 19-year cycle. That approximation built up an error of one day every 310 years, so by the 16th century the lunar calendar was out of phase with the real Moon by four days.

The Gregorian Easter has been used since 1583 by the Roman Catholic Church and was adopted by most Protestant churches between 1753 and 1869.

=== Protestant astronomical Easter ===
In 1700, Denmark and the protestant states of the Holy Roman Empire adopted the solar part of the Gregorian calendar by incorporating its leap day rules to correct the drift of the months. However, rather than adopting the Gregorian Easter tables, they chose to determine the date of Easter using an independent astronomical method, calling this hybrid system the "improved calendar" (Verbesserte Kalender). Easter was calculated from the phases of the moon based on the Rudolphine Tables of Johannes Kepler, which were in turn based on astronomical positions of the Sun and Moon observed by Tycho Brahe at his Uraniborg observatory on the island of Ven. Over the following years, the new calendar was adopted by other Protestant countries as well.

This astronomical Easter was defined as the Sunday after the full moon instant that was after the vernal equinox instant using Uraniborg time (TT + 51 min). However, it was delayed one week if that Sunday was the Jewish date Nisan 15, the first day of Passover week, calculated according to modern Jewish methods. This Nisan 15 rule affected the Easters of 1700, 1778 and 1798. Instead of being one week before the Gregorian Easter, they were postponed by one week and fell on the same Sunday as the Gregorian Easter.

The astronomical rule nevertheless sometimes produced a different date than the Gregorian one. During its use in Germany, the astronomical Easter fell one week before the Gregorian Easter in 1724 and 1744. In Sweden, which adopted the astronomical Easter in 1740, it fell one week before the Gregorian Easter in 1744, but one week after it in 1805, 1811, and 1818. In the Grand Duchy of Finland, which was separated from Sweden in 1809, the astronomical Easter was also observed one week after the Gregorian Easter in 1825, 1829 and 1845.

The discrepancies between the Catholic and Protestant Easter proved inconvenient, leading Denmark and the Holy Roman Empire to adopt the standard Gregorian Easter rules in 1776. Sweden adopted the Gregorian Easter in 1844, while Finland continued to calculate its Easter astronomically until 1869.

=== Modern proposals ===
Two modern astronomical Easters were proposed but never used by any Church. The first was proposed as part of the Revised Julian calendar at a Synod in Constantinople in 1923, and the second was proposed by a 1997 World Council of Churches Consultation in Aleppo in 1997. Both used the same rule as the German and Swedish versions, but used modern astronomical calculations and Jerusalem time (TT + 2 h 21 min) without the Nisan 15 rule. The 1923 version would have placed the astronomical Easter one month before the Gregorian Easter in 1924, 1943, and 1962, but one week after it in 1927, 1954, and 1967. The 1997 version would have placed the astronomical Easter on the same Sunday as the Gregorian Easter for 2000–2025 except for 2019, when it would have been one month earlier.

At the Second Vatican Council, the Catholic Church stated that it had no objections to the feast of Easter being moved to a fixed Sunday subject to ecumenical agreement on the date, or to the adoption of a fixed date for civil purposes so long as this did not compromise the occurrence of Easter on a Sunday and the maintenance of a seven-day week.

== Theory ==
The Easter cycle groups days into lunar months, which are either 29 or 30 days long. There is an exception. The month ending in March normally has 30 days, but if 29 February of a leap year falls within it, it contains 31. As these groups are based on the lunar cycle, over the long term the average month in the lunar calendar is a very good approximation of the synodic month, which is 29.53059 days long.

There are 12 synodic months in a lunar year, totalling either 354 or 355 days. The lunar year is about 11 days shorter than the calendar year, which is either 365 or 366 days long. These days by which the solar year exceeds the lunar year are called epacts (Ancient Greek: ἐπακταὶ ἡμέραι, romanized: epaktaì hēmérai, lit. 'intercalary days').

It is necessary to add them to the day of the solar year to obtain the correct day in the lunar year. Whenever the epact reaches or exceeds 30, an extra intercalary month (or embolismic month) of 30 days must be inserted into the lunar calendar; then 30 must be subtracted from the epact. Charles Wheatly provides the detail:

"Thus beginning the year with March (for that was the ancient custom) they allowed thirty days for the moon [ending] in March, and twenty-nine for that [ending] in April; and thirty again for May, and twenty-nine for June &c. according to the old verses:

Impar luna pari, par fiet in impare mense;
In quo completur mensi lunatio detur.

"For the first, third, fifth, seventh, ninth, and eleventh months, which are called impares menses, or unequal months, have their moons according to computation of thirty days each, which are therefore called pares lunae, or equal moons: but the second, fourth, sixth, eighth, tenth, and twelfth months, which are called pares menses, or equal months, have their moons but twenty nine days each, which are called impares lunae, or unequal moons."

— Wheatly 1871, p. 44

Thus, the lunar month took the name of the Julian month in which it ended. The nineteen-year Metonic cycle assumes that 19 tropical years are as long as 235 synodic months. So after 19 years, the lunations should fall the same way in the solar years, and the epacts should repeat. Over 19 years the epact increases by 19 × 11 = 209 ≡ 29 (mod 30), not 0 (mod 30). That is, 209 divided by 30 leaves a remainder of 29 instead of being a multiple of 30. This is a problem if compensation is only done by adding months of 30 days. So after 19 years, the epact must be corrected by one day for the cycle to repeat. This is the so-called saltus lunae ("leap of the moon"). The Julian calendar handles it by reducing the length of the lunar month that begins on 1 July in the last year of the cycle to 29 days. This makes three successive 29-day months. (Note: Although prior to the replacement of the Julian calendar in 1752 some printers of the Book of Common Prayer placed the saltus correctly, beginning the next month on 30 July, none of them continued the sequence correctly to the end of the year.)

The saltus and the seven extra 30-day months were largely hidden by being located at the points where the Julian and lunar months begin at about the same time. The extra months commenced on 1 January (year 3), 2 September (year 5), 6 March (year 8), 3 January (year 11), 31 December (year 13), 1 September (year 16), and 5 March (year 19). The sequence number of the year in the 19-year cycle is called the "golden number", and is given by the formula

GN = (Y mod 19) + 1

That is, the year number Y in the Christian era is divided by 19, and the remainder plus 1 is the golden number. (Some sources specify that one adds 1 before taking the remainder; in that case, one needs to treat a result of 0 as the golden number 19. In the formula above, the remainder is taken first and then 1 is added, so no such adjustment is necessary.) (Note: "the [Golden Number] of a year AD is found by adding one, dividing by 19, and taking the remainder (treating 0 as 19)."(Blackburn & Holford-Strevens 1999, p. 810).)

Cycles of 19 years are not all the same length, because they may have either four or five leap years. But a period of four cycles, 76 years (a Callippic cycle), has a length of 76 × 365 + 19 = 27,759 days (if it does not cross a century division). There are 235 × 4 = 940 lunar months in this period, so the average length is 27759 / 940 or about 29.530851 days. There are 76 × 6 = 456 usual nominal 30-day lunar months and the same number of usual nominal 29-day months, but with 19 of these lengthened by a day on leap days, plus 24 intercalated months of 30 days and four intercalated months of 29 days. Since this is longer than the true length of a synodic month, about 29.53059 days, the calculated Paschal full moon gets later and later compared to the astronomical full moon, unless a correction is made as in the Gregorian system (see below).

The paschal or Easter-month is the first one in the year to have its fourteenth day (its formal full moon) on or after 21 March. Easter is the Sunday after its 14th day (or, saying the same thing, the Sunday within its third week). The paschal lunar month always begins on a date in the 29-day period from 8 March to 5 April inclusive. It is the fourteenth day, therefore, always falls on a date between 21 March and 18 April inclusive (in the Gregorian or Julian calendar, for the Western and Eastern system, resp.), and the following Sunday then necessarily falls on a date in the range 22 March to 25 April inclusive. However, in the Western system Easter cannot fall on 22 March during the 300-year period 1900–2199 (see below). In the solar calendar, Easter is called a moveable feast because its date is not fixed each year (unlike, e.g., Christmas). But in the lunar calendar, Easter is always the third Sunday in the paschal lunar month, and is no more "moveable" than any holiday that is fixed to a particular day of the week and week within a month, such as Thanksgiving.

== Tabular methods ==
=== Gregorian reform of the computus ===
As reforming the computus was the primary motivation for the introduction of the Gregorian calendar in 1582, a corresponding computus methodology was introduced alongside the new calendar. (Note: See especially the first, second, fourth, and sixth canon, and the calendarium) The general method of working was given by Clavius in the Six Canons (1582), and a full explanation followed in his Explicatio (1603).

Easter is the Sunday following the Paschal full moon date. The paschal full moon date is the ecclesiastical full moon date on or after the ecclesiastical equinox on 21 March. The fourteenth day of the lunar month is ecclesiastically considered the day of the full moon. It is the day of the lunar month on which the moment of opposition ("full moon") is most likely to fall.

The Gregorian method derives new moon dates by determining the epact for each year. The epact can have a value from * (0 or 30) to 29 days. It is the age of the moon in days (i.e. the lunar date) on 1 January, reduced by one day. The "new moon" is most likely to become visible (as a slender crescent in the western sky after sunset) on the first day of the lunar month. The conjunction of Sun and Moon ("new moon") is most likely to fall on the preceding day, which is day 29 of a "hollow" (29-day) month and day 30 of a "full" (30-day) month.

Historically, in Beda Venerabilis' Easter cycle, the paschal full moon date for a year was found from its sequence number in the Metonic cycle, called the golden number, which cycle repeats the lunar phase on January 1 every 19 years. This method was modified in the Gregorian reform because the tabular dates go out of sync with reality after about two centuries. From the epact method, a simplified table can be constructed that has a validity of one to three centuries.

Current Metonic cycle
Year	2014	2015	2016	2017	2018	2019	2020	2021	2022	2023	2024	2025	2026	2027	2028	2029	2030	2031	2032
Golden number	1	2	3	4	5	6	7	8	9	10	11	12	13	14	15	16	17	18	19
Epact (Note: Can be verified by using Blackburn & Holford-Strevens 1999, p. 825, Table 7.)	29	10	21	2	13	24	5	16	27	8	19	*	11	22	3	14	25	6	17
Full moon	14; Apr	3 Apr	23; Mar	11; Apr	31; Mar	18; Apr	8 Apr	28; Mar	16; Apr	5 Apr	25; Mar	13; Apr	2 Apr	22; Mar	10; Apr	30; Mar	17; Apr	7 Apr	27; Mar

The date of the paschal full moon in a particular year is usually either 11 days earlier than in the previous year or 19 days later. In 5 out of 19 years, it is one day less: in years 1, 6, and 17 of the cycle, the date is only 18 days later, and in years 7 and 18, it is only 10 days earlier than in the previous year.

In the Eastern system, the Paschal full moon is usually four days later than in the West. It is 34 days later in 5 of the 19 years, and 5 days later in years 6 and 17, because in those years, the Gregorian system puts the Paschal full moon a day earlier than it would normally be, in order to keep Easter before April 26, as explained below. In the year 2100, the difference will increase by another day. (Note: because the Julian calendar will have a leap year, but the Gregorian will not.)

==== Calendarium ====
The epacts are used to find the dates of the new moon in the following way: Write down a table of all 365 days of the year (the leap day is ignored). Then label all dates with a Roman numeral counting downwards, from "*" (0 or 30), xxix (29), down to i (1), starting from 1 January, and repeat this to the end of the year. However, in every second such period, count only 29 days and label the date with xxv (25), also with xxiv (24). Treat the 13th period (last eleven days) as long, therefore, and assign the labels xxv and xxiv to sequential dates (26 and 27 December respectively).

Add the label "25" to the dates that have xxv in the 30-day periods; but in 29-day periods (which have xxiv together with xxv), add the label "25" to the date with xxvi. The distribution of the lengths of the months and the length of the epact cycles is such that each civil calendar month starts and ends with the same epact label, except for February and, one might say, for August, which starts with the double label xxv/xxiv but ends with the single label xxiv. This table is called the calendarium. The ecclesiastical new moons for any year are those dates when the epact for the year is entered.

If the epact for the year is, for instance, 27, then there is an ecclesiastical new moon on every date in that year that has the epact label xxvii (27). If the epact is 25, then there is a complication introduced so that the ecclesiastical new moon will not fall on the same date twice during a Metonic cycle. If the epact cycle in force includes epact 24 (as does the cycle in use since 1900 and until 2199), then an epact of 25 puts the ecclesiastical new moon on April 4 (having the label "25"), otherwise it is on April 5 (having label xxv).

An epact of 25, giving April 4, can only happen if the golden number is greater than 11. In which case, it will be 11 years after a year with epact 24. So, for example, in 1954, the golden number was 17, the epact was 25, the ecclesiastical new moon was reckoned on April 4, the full moon on April 17. Easter was on April 18 rather than April 25 as it would otherwise have been, such as in 1886 when the golden number was 6. This system automatically intercalates seven months per Metonic cycle.

Label all the dates in the table with letters "A" to "G", starting from 1 January, and repeat to the end of the year. If, for instance, the first Sunday of the year is on 5 January, which has the letter "E", then every date with the letter "E" is a Sunday that year. Then "E" is called the dominical letter (DL) for that year – from dies dominica (Latin for 'the Lord's day'). The dominical letter cycles backward one position every year. In leap years, after 24 February, the Sundays fall on the previous letter of the cycle, so leap years have two dominical letters: the first for before, the second for after the leap day.

In practice, for the purpose of calculating Easter, this need not be done for all 365 days of the year. For the epacts, March comes out exactly the same as January, because 31 + 28 days = 30 + 29 epacts, so one need not calculate January or February. To avoid the need to calculate the dominical letters for January and February, start with D for 1 March. You need the epacts only from 8 March to 5 April.

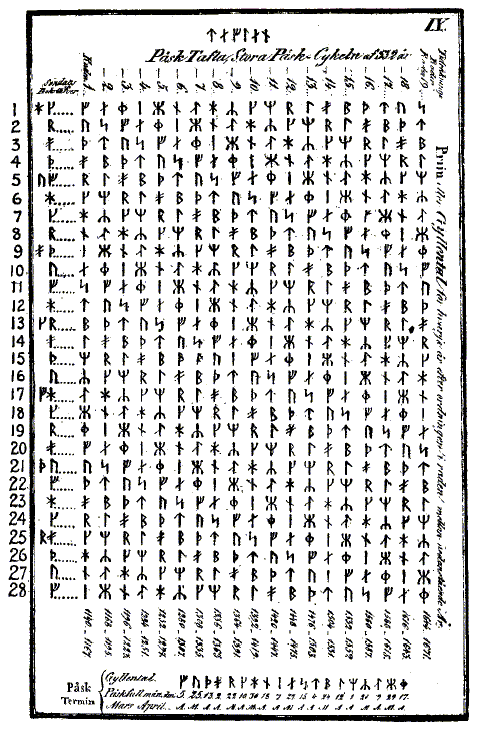
A table from Sweden to find the date of Easter 1140–1671 according to the Julian calendar. Each column corresponds to a period of 28 years. Notice the runes used as arbitrary symbols.

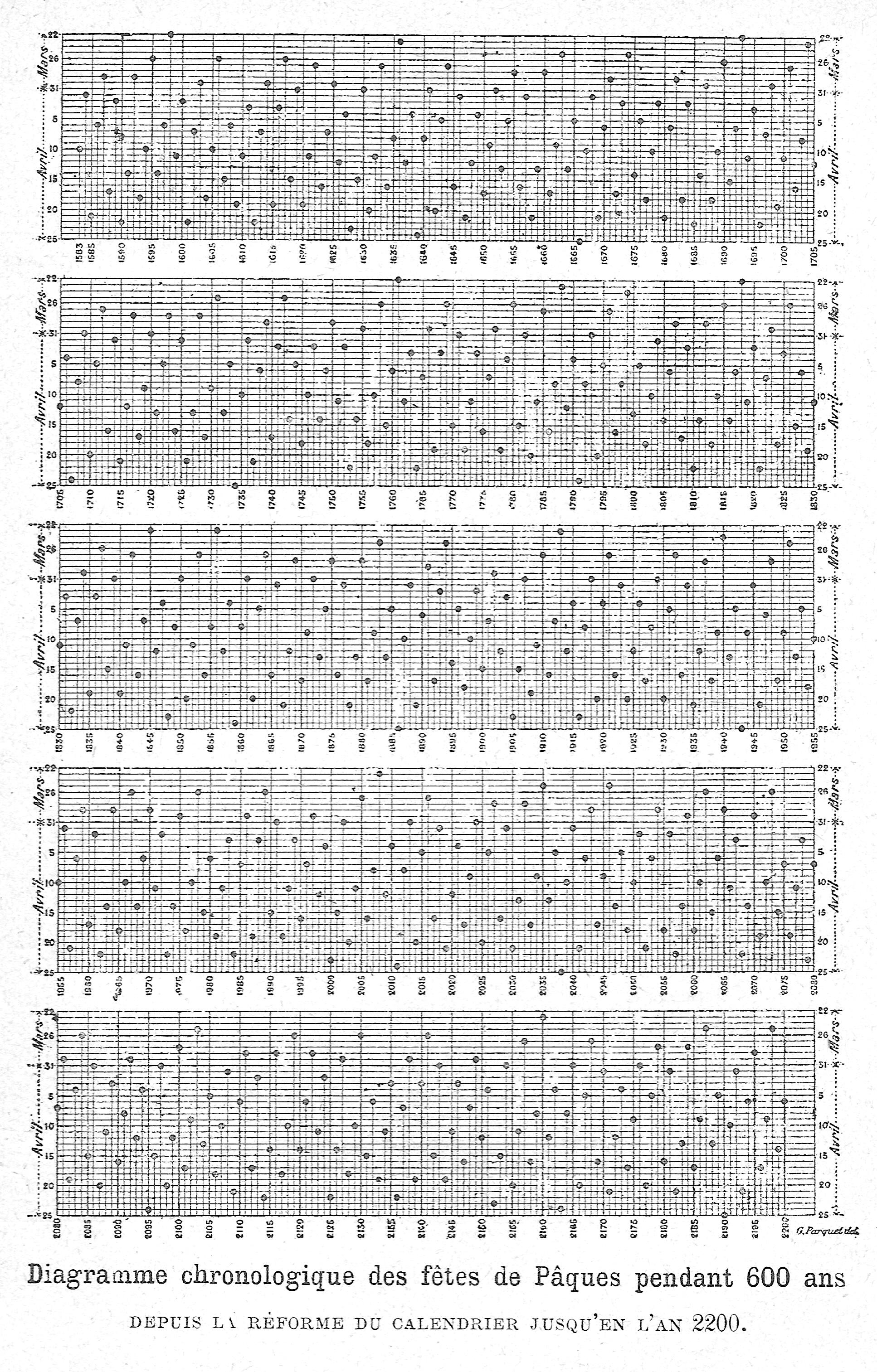
Chronological diagram of the date of Easter for 600 years, from the Gregorian calendar reform to the year 2200 (by Camille Flammarion, 1907).

Calendarium restricted to March and April
Epact label	March	DL	April	DL
*	1	D		
xxix	2	E	1	G
xxviii	3	F	2	A
xxvii	4	G	3	B
xxvi	5	A	4	C
25	6	B	4	C
xxv	6	B	5	D
xxiv	7	C	5	D
xxiii	8	D	6	E
xxii	9	E	7	F
xxi	10	F	8	G
xx	11	G	9	A
xix	12	A	10	B
xviii	13	B	11	C
xvii	14	C	12	D
xvi	15	D	13	E
xv	16	E	14	F
xiv	17	F	15	G
xiii	18	G	16	A
xii	19	A	17	B
xi	20	B	18	C
x	21	C	19	D
ix	22	D	20	E
viii	23	E	21	F
vii	24	F	22	G
vi	25	G	23	A
v	26	A	24	B
iv	27	B	25	C
iii	28	C	26	D
ii	29	D	27	E
i	30	E	28	F
*	31	F	29	G
xxix			30	A

In 2026, the epact is 11, which means an ecclesiastical new moon falls on every date labeled xi. The ecclesiastical full moon falls 13 days later. From the table above, this gives new moons on 20 March and 18 April, and so full moons on 3 March and 2 April. Then Easter Day is the first Sunday after the first ecclesiastical full moon on or after 21 March. That means, the 2026 paschal full moon is on 2 April. The dominical letter for 2026 is D, which means Easter day is on 5 April.

==== Corrections ====
The label "25" (as distinct from "xxv") is used as follows: Within a Metonic cycle, years that are 11 years apart have epacts that differ by one day. A month beginning on a date having labels "xxiv" and "xxv" written side by side has either 29 or 30 days. If the epacts 24 and 25 both occur within one Metonic cycle, then the new (and full) moons would fall on the same dates for these two years. This is possible for the real moon (Note: In 2004 and again in 2015, there were full moons on 2 and 31 July.) but is inelegant in a schematic lunar calendar; the dates should repeat only after 19 years. To avoid this, in years that have epacts 25 and with a Golden Number larger than 11, the reckoned new moon falls on the date with the label 25 rather than xxv. Where the labels 25 and xxv are together, there is no problem since they are the same. This does not move the problem to the pair "25" and "xxvi", because the earliest epact 26 could appear would be in year 23 of the cycle, which lasts only 19 years: there is a saltus lunae in between that makes the new moons fall on separate dates.

The Gregorian calendar has a correction to the tropical year by dropping three leap days in 400 years (always in a century year). This is a correction to the length of the tropical year, but should not affect the Metonic relation between years and lunations. Therefore, the epact is compensated for this (partially – see epact) by subtracting one in these century years. This is the so-called solar correction or "solar equation" ("equation" being used in its medieval sense of "correction").

However, 19 uncorrected Julian years are a little longer than 235 lunations. The difference accumulates to one day in about 308 years, or 0.00324 days per year. In one cycle, the epact decreases due to the solar correction by 19 × 0.0075 = 0.1425 on average, so a cycle is equivalent to 235 − 0.1425/30 = 234.99525 months, whereas there are actually 19 × 365.2425 / 29.5305889 ≈ 234.997261 synodic months. The difference of 0.002011 synodic months per 19-year cycle, or 0.003126 days per year, necessitates an occasional lunar correction to the epact. In the Gregorian calendar, this is done by adding 1 eight times in 2,500 (Gregorian) years (slightly more than 2500 × 0.003126, or about 7.8), always in a century year: this is the so-called lunar correction (historically called "lunar equation"). The first one was applied in 1800, the next is in 2100, and will be applied every 300 years except for an interval of 400 years between 3900 and 4300, which starts a new cycle. At the time of the reform, the epacts were changed by 7, even though 10 days were skipped, to make a three-day correction to the timing of the new moons.

The solar and lunar corrections work in opposite directions, and in some century years (for example, 1800 and 2100) they cancel each other. The result is that the Gregorian lunar calendar uses an epact table that is valid for a period of from 100 to 300 years. The epact table listed above is valid for the 20th, 21st and 22nd centuries.

==== Details ====
Dates of Easter, 1900 to 2199

This method of computation has several subtleties:

Every other lunar month has only 29 days, so one day must have two (of the 30) epact labels assigned to it. The reason for moving around the epact label "xxv/25" rather than any other seems to be the following: According to Dionysius (in his introductory letter to Petronius), the Nicene council, on the authority of Eusebius, established that the first month of the ecclesiastical lunar year (the paschal month) should start between 8 March and 5 April inclusive, and the 14th day fall between 21 March and 18 April inclusive, thus spanning a period of (only) 29 days. A new moon on 7 March, which has epact label "xxiv", has its 14th day (full moon) on 20 March, which is too early (not following 20 March). So years with an epact of "xxiv", if the lunar month beginning on 7 March had 30 days, would have their paschal new moon on 6 April, which is too late: The full moon would fall on 19 April, and Easter could be as late as 26 April. In the Julian calendar the latest date of Easter was 25 April, and the Gregorian reform maintained that limit. So the paschal full moon must fall no later than 18 April and the new moon on 5 April, which has epact label "xxv". 5 April must therefore have its double epact labels "xxiv" and "xxv". Then epact "xxv" must be treated differently, as explained in the previous section.

Distribution of the date of Easter for the complete 5,700,000 year cycle

The relation between lunar and solar calendar dates is made independent of the leap day scheme for the solar year. Essentially, the Gregorian calendar still uses the Julian calendar with a leap day every four years, so a Metonic cycle of 19 years has 6,940 or 6,939 days with five or four leap days. Now the lunar cycle counts only 19 × 354 + 19 × 11 = 6,935 days. By not labeling and counting the leap day with an epact number, but having the next new moon fall on the same calendar date as without the leap day, the current lunation gets extended by a day, (Note: Traditionally in the Christian West, this situation was handled by extending the first 29-day lunar month of the year to 30 days, and beginning the following lunar month one day later than otherwise if it was due to begin before the leap day.(Blackburn & Holford-Strevens 1999, p. 813).) and the 235 lunations cover as many days as the 19 years (so long as the 19 years do not include a "solar correction" as in 1900). So the burden of synchronizing the calendar with the moon (intermediate-term accuracy) is shifted to the solar calendar, which may use any suitable intercalation scheme, all under the assumption that 19 solar years = 235 lunations (creating a long-term inaccuracy if not corrected by a "lunar correction"). A consequence is that the reckoned age of the moon may be off by a day, and also that the lunations that contain the leap day may be 31 days long, which would never happen if the real moon were followed (short-term inaccuracies). This is the price of a regular fit to the solar calendar.

From the perspective of those who might wish to use the Gregorian Easter cycle as a calendar for the entire year, there are some flaws in the Gregorian lunar calendar (although they have no effect on the paschal month and the date of Easter):

1. Lunations of 31 (and sometimes 28) days occur.
2. If a year with Golden Number 19 happens to have epact 19, then the last ecclesiastical new moon falls on 2 December; the next would be due on 1 January. However, at the start of the new year, a saltus lunae increases the epact by another unit, and the new moon should have occurred on the previous day. So a new moon is missed. The calendarium of the Missale Romanum takes account of this by assigning epact label "19" instead of "xx" to 31 December of such a year, making that date the new moon. It happened every 19 years when the original Gregorian epact table was in effect (for the last time in 1690), and next happens in 8511.
3. If the epact of a year is 20, an ecclesiastical new moon falls on 31 December. If that year falls before a century year, then in most cases, a solar correction reduces the epact for the new year by one: The resulting epact "*" means that another ecclesiastical new moon is counted on 1 January. So, formally, a lunation of one day has passed. This next happens in 4199–4200.
4. Other borderline cases occur (much) later, and if the rules are followed strictly and these cases are not specially treated, they generate successive new moon dates that are 1, 28, 59, or (very rarely) 58 days apart.

A careful analysis shows that through the way they are used and corrected in the Gregorian calendar, the epacts are actually 1/30 of a lunation and not full days. See epact for a discussion.

The solar and lunar corrections repeat after 4 × 25 = 100 centuries. In that period, the epact for a given golden number changes by a total of −1 × 3/4 × 100 + 1 × 8/25 × 100 = −43 ≡ 17 mod 30. This is prime to the 30 possible epacts, so it takes 100 × 30 = 3,000 centuries before the epact mappings repeat; and 3,000 × 19 = 57,000 centuries before they repeat at the same golden number. It is not obvious how many ecclesiastic New Moons are counted in this 5.7 Myr period. The Metonic cycles add up to (5,700,000/19) × 235 = 70,500,000 lunations. But there are net −43 × (5,700,000/10,000) corrections to the epacts, which, divided by 30, add up to a correction of −817 lunations, for a total of 70,499,183 lunations. This number appears to have been first derived by Magnus Georg Paucker in 1837. It is also mentioned in the chapter on calendars (p. 744) in the Nautical Almanac of 1931 and in the Explanatory Supplement of 1992 (p. 582). (Note: The Expl.Suppl. of 2013 on p.599 instead specifies 70,499,175 lunations, without explanation or reference. This number appears to be the truncated value of dividing 2,081,882,250 days by 29.53059, which is a rounded value for the lunation length found in the table at the top of p.587. So the number of 70,499,175 would be an estimate of the actual number of lunations in a 5.7Myr period, and not the number of New Moons actually counted by the Gregorian lunar calendar over its full cycle.) So the Gregorian Easter dates repeat in exactly the same order only after 5,700,000 years, 70,499,183 lunations, or 2,081,882,250 days; the mean lunation length is then 2,081,882,250/70,499,183 = 29.53058690 days. Of course, the calendar would have to be adjusted after a few millennia because of changes in the length of the tropical year, the synodic month, and the day.

Graphs of the dates of Western and Eastern Orthodox Easter Sunday compared with the March equinox and full moons from 1950 to 2050 on the Gregorian calendar

This raises the question of why the Gregorian lunar calendar has separate solar and lunar corrections, which sometimes cancel each other. Lilius's original work has not been preserved, but his proposal was described in the Compendium Novae Rationis Restituendi Kalendarium circulated in 1577, in which it is explained that the correction system he devised was to be a perfectly flexible tool in the hands of future calendar reformers, since the solar and lunar calendar could henceforth be corrected without mutual interference. An example of this flexibility was provided through an alternative intercalation sequence derived from Copernicus's theories, along with its corresponding epact corrections.

The "solar corrections" approximately undo the effect of the Gregorian modifications to the leap days of the solar calendar on the lunar calendar: they (partially) bring the epact cycle back to the original Metonic relation between the Julian year and lunar month. The inherent mismatch between Sun and Moon in this basic 19-year cycle is then corrected every three or four centuries by the "lunar correction" to the epacts. However, the epact corrections occur at the beginning of Gregorian centuries, not Julian centuries, and therefore the original Julian Metonic cycle is not fully restored.

While the net 4 × 8 − 3 × 25 = 43 epact subtractions could be distributed evenly over 10,000 years (as has been proposed for example by Lichtenberg 2003, pp. 45–76) if the corrections are combined, then the inaccuracies of the two cycles are also added and cannot be corrected separately.

The ratios of (mean solar) days per year and days per lunation change both because of intrinsic long-term variations in the orbits, and because the rotation of the Earth is slowing down due to tidal deceleration, so the Gregorian parameters become increasingly obsolete.

This does affect the date of the equinox, but it so happens that the interval between northward (northern hemisphere spring) equinoxes has been fairly stable over historical times, especially if measured in mean solar time.

Also the drift in ecclesiastical full moons calculated by the Gregorian method compared to the true full moons is affected less than one would expect, because the increase in the length of the day is almost exactly compensated for by the increase in the length of the month, as tidal braking transfers angular momentum of the rotation of the Earth to orbital angular momentum of the Moon.

The Ptolemaic value of the length of the mean synodic month, established around the 4th century BCE by the Babylonians, is 29 days 12 hr 44 min 3 1/3 s (see Kidinnu); the current value is 0.46 s less (see new moon). In the same historic stretch of time, the length of the mean tropical year has diminished by about 10 s. (All values mean solar time.)

==== British Calendar Act and Book of Common Prayer ====
The portion of the tabular methods section above describes the historical arguments and methods by which the present dates of Easter Sunday were decided in the late 16th century by the Catholic Church. In Britain, where the Julian calendar was then still in use, Easter Sunday was defined, from 1662 to 1752 (in accordance with previous practice), by a simple table of dates in the Anglican Book of Common Prayer (decreed by the Act of Uniformity 1662). The table was indexed directly by the golden number and the Sunday letter, which (in the Easter section of the book) were presumed to be already known.

For the British Empire and colonies, the new determination of the date of Easter Sunday was defined by what is now called the Calendar (New Style) Act 1750 in an annexe that declares its effect on the Book of Common Prayer. The method was chosen to give dates agreeing with the Gregorian rule already in use elsewhere, without recognising any Papal authority. As the Church of England is the established church, Parliament could (and did) require that the dates in the Book of Common Prayer be modified accordingly, and therefore it is the general Anglican rule. The original act can be seen in the British Statutes at Large 1765. The annexe to the act includes the definition: "Easter-day (on which the rest depend) is always the first Sunday after the Full Moon, which happens upon, or next after the Twenty-first Day of March. And if the Full Moon happens upon a Sunday, Easter-day is the Sunday after." The annexe subsequently uses the terms "Paschal Full Moon" and "Ecclesiastical Full Moon", making it clear that they approximate to the real full moon.

The method is quite distinct from that described above in § Gregorian reform of the computus. For a general year, one first determines the golden number, then one uses three tables to determine the Sunday letter, a "cypher", and the date of the paschal full moon, from which the date of Easter Sunday follows. The epact does not explicitly appear. Simpler tables can be used for limited periods (such as 1900–2199) during which the cypher (which represents the effect of the solar and lunar corrections) does not change. Clavius's details were employed in the construction of the method, but they play no subsequent part in its use.

J. R. Stockton shows his derivation of an efficient computer algorithm traceable to the tables in the prayer book and the Calendar Act (assuming that a description of how to use the Tables is at hand), and verifies its processes by computing matching tables.

==== Easter paradoxy ====
Due to the inevitable discrepancies arising from the approximations of the Computus algorithm, differences will occur in several years between the date of Easter as calculated according to the Gregorian rule (using the ecclesiastical full moon and ecclesiastical equinox) and its hypothetical date as calculated by actual astronomical observation. These discrepancies are called Easter paradoxies. In a 1928 paper, Ludwig Lange (1863–1936) investigated and classified different types of Easter paradoxies, particularly those in 1924, 1943 and 1962.

=== Julian calendar ===
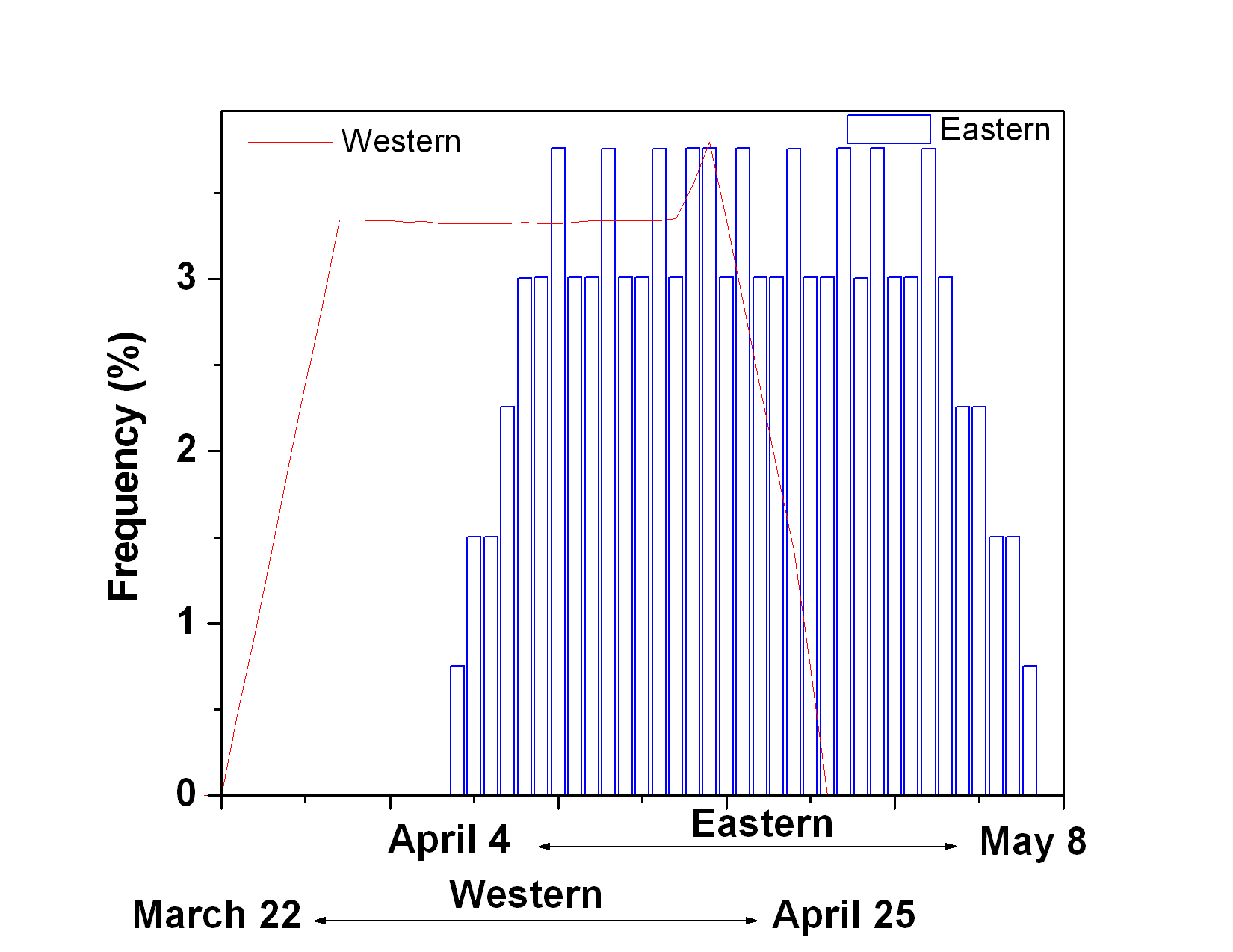
Distribution of the date of Easter 1900–2099 in most Eastern denominations vis-à-vis the Western

The method for computing the date of the ecclesiastical full moon that was standard for the western Church before the Gregorian calendar reform, and is still used today by most eastern Christians, made use of an uncorrected repetition of the 19-year Metonic cycle in combination with the Julian calendar. In terms of the method of the epacts discussed above, it effectively used a single epact table starting with an epact of 0, which was never corrected. In this case, the epact was counted on 22 March, the earliest acceptable date for Easter. This repeats every 19 years, so there are only 19 possible dates for the paschal full moon from 21 March to 18 April inclusive.

Because there are no corrections as there are for the Gregorian calendar, the ecclesiastical full moon drifts away from the true full moon by more than three days every millennium. It is already a few days later. As a result, the eastern churches celebrate Easter one week later than the western churches about 44% of the time, and on the same day about 30% of the time. (The eastern Easter is occasionally four or five weeks later because the Julian calendar is 13 days behind the Gregorian in 1900–2099, and so the Gregorian paschal full moon is sometimes before Julian 21 March.)

The sequence number of a year in the 19-year cycle is called its golden number. This term was first used in the computistic poem Massa Compoti by Alexander de Villa Dei in 1200. A later scribe added the golden number to tables originally composed by Abbo of Fleury in 988.

The claim by the Catholic Church in the 1582 papal bull Inter gravissimas, which promulgated the Gregorian calendar, that it restored "the celebration of Easter according to the rules fixed by ... the great ecumenical council of Nicaea" was based on a false claim by Dionysius Exiguus (525) that "we determine the date of Easter Day ... in accordance with the proposal agreed upon by the 318 Fathers of the Church at the Council in Nicaea."

The First Council of Nicaea (325) did not, however, provide any explicit rules to determine that date, but only wrote "all our brethren in the East who formerly followed the custom of the Jews are henceforth to celebrate the said most sacred feast of Easter at the same time with the Romans and yourselves [the Church of Alexandria] and all those who have observed Easter from the beginning." The medieval computus was based on the Alexandrian computus, which was developed by the Church of Alexandria during the first decade of the 4th century using the Alexandrian calendar.

The eastern Roman Empire accepted it shortly after 380 after converting the computus to the Julian calendar. Rome accepted it some time between the sixth and ninth centuries. The British Isles accepted it during the eighth century except for a few monasteries. Francia (all of western Europe except Scandinavia (pagan), the British Isles, the Iberian peninsula, and southern Italy) accepted it during the last quarter of the eighth century.

The last Celtic monastery to accept it, Iona, did so in 716. The last English monastery to accept it did so in 931. Before these dates, other methods produced Easter Sunday dates that could differ by up to five weeks.

This is the table of paschal full moon dates for all Julian years since 931:

Golden number	1	2	3	4	5	6	7	8	9	10	11	12	13	14	15	16	17	18	19
Paschal full moon date (Julian)	5 Apr	25; Mar	13; Apr	2 Apr	22; Mar	10; Apr	30; Mar	18; Apr	7 Apr	27; Mar	15; Apr	4 Apr	24; Mar	12; Apr	1 Apr	21; Mar	9 Apr	29; Mar	17; Apr
Paschal full moon date, 1900–2099, Gregorian calendar	18; Apr	7 Apr	26; Apr	15; Apr	4 Apr	23; Apr	12; Apr	1 May	20; Apr	9 Apr	28; Apr	17; Apr	6 Apr	25; Apr	14; Apr	3 Apr	22; Apr	11; Apr	30; Apr
Paschal full moon date, Western, 1900-2199 (Gregorian)	14; Apr	3 Apr	23; Mar	11; Apr	31; Mar	18; Apr	8 Apr	28; Mar	16; Apr	5 Apr	25; Mar	13; Apr	2 Apr	22; Mar	10; Apr	30; Mar	17; Apr	7 Apr	27; Mar

As mentioned earlier, these Paschal full moons are 4, 5 or 34 days later than in the Western system, and are around three days later than the astronomical full moon. (For example, the April 2015 lunar eclipse was on April 4 in the Gregorian calendar, or March 22 in the Julian calendar, but the Paschal full moon for that year (golden number 2) was March 25 in the Julian calendar.) Whenever there is a lunar correction the differences between the Western and Eastern ecclesiastical full moons increase by 1, so from 2100 to 2399 the differences will be 5, 6, or 35 days. The range of dates in the Gregorian calendar of the Eastern Paschal full moon moves one day later every time there is a solar correction, so from 2100 to 2199 it will be 5 April to 9 May. At present there are five years per cycle when the Eastern Easter is several weeks later than the Western, at golden numbers 3, 8, 11, 14, and 19. This will increase to six times per cycle in 2200 (adding golden number 6), to seven in 2300 (adding golden number 17), then go back to six in 2400 (lunar correction and no solar correction), back to seven in 2500, and go to eight only in 2900 (adding golden number 9).

Example calculation using this table:

The golden number for 1573 is 16 (1573 + 1 = 1574; 1574 ÷ 19 = 82 remainder 16). From the table, the paschal full moon for golden number 16 is 21 March. From the week table 21 March is Saturday. Easter Sunday is the following Sunday, 22 March.

So for a given date of the ecclesiastical full moon, there are seven possible Easter dates. The cycle of Sunday letters, does not repeat in seven years: because of the interruptions of the leap day every four years, the full cycle in which weekdays recur in the calendar in the same way, is 4 × 7 = 28 years, the solar cycle. So the Easter dates repeated in the same order after 4 × 7 × 19 = 532 years. This paschal cycle is also called the Victorian cycle, after Victorius of Aquitaine, who introduced it in Rome in 457.

It is first known to have been used by Annianus of Alexandria at the beginning of the 5th century. It has also sometimes erroneously been called the Dionysian cycle, after Dionysius Exiguus, who prepared Easter tables that started in 532. He apparently did not realize that the Alexandrian computus he described had a 532-year cycle, although he did realize that his 95-year table was not a true cycle. Venerable Bede (7th century) seems to have been the first to identify the solar cycle, and explain the paschal cycle from the Metonic cycle and the solar cycle.

In medieval western Europe, the dates of the paschal full moon (14 Nisan) given above could be memorized with the help of a 19-line alliterative poem in Latin:

Nonae Aprilis	norunt quinos	V
octonae kalendae	assim depromunt.	I
Idus Aprilis	etiam sexis,	VI
nonae quaternae	namque dipondio.	II
Item undene	ambiunt quinos,	V
quatuor idus	capiunt ternos.	III
Ternas kalendas	titulant seni,	VI
quatuor dene	cubant in quadris.	IIII
Septenas idus	septem eligunt,	VII
senae kalendae	sortiunt ternos,	III
denis septenis	donant assim.	I
Pridie nonas	porro quaternis,	IIII
nonae kalendae	notantur septenis.	VII
Pridie idus	panditur quinis,	V
kalendas Aprilis	exprimunt unus.	I
Duodene namque	docte quaternis,	IIII
speciem quintam	speramus duobus.	II
Quaternae kalendae	quinque coniciunt,	V
quindene constant	tribus adeptis.	III

The first half-line of each line gives the date of the paschal full moon from the table above for each year in the 19-year cycle. The second half-line gives the ferial regular, or weekday displacement, of the day of that year's paschal full moon from the concurrent, or the weekday of 24 March. The ferial regular is repeated in Roman numerals in the third column.

== Algorithms ==
=== Note on operations ===
When expressing Easter algorithms without using tables, it has been customary to employ only the integer operations addition, subtraction, multiplication, division, modulo, and assignment as it is compatible with the use of simple mechanical or electronic calculators. That restriction is undesirable for computer programming, where conditional operators and statements, as well as look-up tables, are available. One can easily see how conversion from day-of-March (22 to 56) to day-and-month (22 March to 25 April) can be done as if (DoM > 31) {Day=DoM-31, Month=Apr} else {Day=DoM, Month=Mar}. More importantly, using such conditionals also simplifies the core of the Gregorian calculation.

=== Gauss's Easter algorithm ===
In 1800, the mathematician Carl Friedrich Gauss presented this algorithm for calculating the date of the Julian or Gregorian Easter. He corrected the expression for calculating the variable p in 1816. In 1800, he incorrectly stated p = floor (k/3) = ⌊k/3⌋. In 1807, he replaced the condition (11M + 11) mod 30 < 19 with the simpler a > 10. In 1811, he limited his algorithm to the 18th and 19th centuries only, and stated that 26 April is always replaced with 19, and 25 April by 18 April in the circumstances stated. In 1816, he thanked his student Peter Paul Tittel for pointing out that p was wrong in the original version.

gauss_computus_paschalis:
    input(year, calendar)
    
    a = year % 19
    b = year % 4
    c = year % 7

    if calendar is GREGORIAN:
        k = year // 100
        p = (13 + 8 * k) // 25  # fixed (1816), was: k // 3
        q = k // 4
        M = (15 - p + k - q) % 30
        N = (4 + k - q) % 7
    else if calendar is JULIAN:
        M = 15
        N = 6

    d = (19 * a + M) % 30
    e = (2 * b + 4 * c + 6 * d + N) % 7
    march_easter = d + e + 22
    april_easter = d + e - 9

    if april_easter == 25 and d == 28 and e == 6 and a > 10:  # changed (1807), was: (11 * M + 11) % 30 < 19
        april_easter = 18

    if april_easter == 26 and d == 29 and e == 6:
        april_easter = 19

    if march_easter <= 31:
        output(3, march_easter)
    else:
        output(4, april_easter)

Gauss's Easter algorithm can be divided into two parts for analysis. The first part is the approximate tracking of the lunar orbit, and the second part is the exact deterministic offsetting to obtain a Sunday following the full moon.

The first part consists of determining the variable d, the number of days (counting from 22 March) to the day after the full moon. The formula for d contains the terms 19a and the constant M. a is the year's position in the 19-year lunar phase cycle, in which, by assumption, the moon's movement relative to Earth repeats every 19 calendar years. In older times, 19 calendar years were equated to 235 lunar months (the Metonic cycle), which is a close approximation since 235 lunar months amount to 6939.6813 days and 19 solar years are on average 6939.6075 days.

The expression (19a + M) mod 30 repeats every 19 years within each century as M is determined per century. The 19-year cycle has nothing to do with the '19' in 19a; it is just a coincidence that another '19' appears. The '19' in 19a comes from correcting the mismatch between a calendar year and an integer number of lunar months.

A calendar year (non-leap year) has 365 days, and the closest one can come with an integer number of lunar months is 12 × 29.5 = 354 days. The difference is 11 days, which must be corrected for by moving the following year's occurrence of a full moon 11 days back. But in modulo 30 arithmetic, subtracting 11 is the same as adding 19, hence the addition of 19 for each year added, i.e. 19a.

The M in 19a + M serves to have a correct starting point at the start of each century. It is determined by a calculation taking the number of leap years up until that century where k inhibits a leap day every 100 years and q reinstalls it every 400 years, yielding (k − q) as the total number of inhibitions to the pattern of a leap day every four years. Thus, we add (k − q) to correct for leap days that never occurred. p corrects for the lunar orbit not being fully describable in integer terms.

The range of days considered for the full moon to determine Easter are 21 March (the day of the ecclesiastical equinox of spring) to 18 April—a 29-day range. However, in the mod 30 arithmetic of variable d and constant M, both of which can have integer values in the range 0 to 29, the range is 30. Therefore, adjustments are made in critical cases. Once d is determined, this is the number of days to add to 22 March (the day after the earliest possible full moon allowed, which is coincident with the ecclesiastical equinox of spring) to obtain the date of the day after the full moon.

So the first allowable date of Easter is March 22 + d + 0, as Easter is to celebrate the Sunday after the ecclesiastical full moon; that is, if the full moon falls on Sunday 21 March, Easter is to be celebrated 7 days after, while if the full moon falls on Saturday 21 March, Easter is the following 22 March.

The second part is finding e, the additional offset days that must be added to the date offset d to make it arrive at a Sunday. Since the week has 7 days, the offset must be in the range 0 to 6 and determined by modulo 7 arithmetic. e is determined by calculating 2b + 4c + 6d + N mod 7. These constants may seem strange at first, but are quite easily explainable if we remember that we operate under mod 7 arithmetic. To begin with, 2b + 4c ensures that we take care of the fact that weekdays slide for each year.

A normal year has 365 days, but 52 × 7 = 364, so 52 full weeks make up one day too little. Hence, each consecutive year, the weekday "slides one day forward", meaning if 6 May was a Wednesday one year, it is a Thursday the following year (disregarding leap years). Both b and c increase by one for an advancement of one year (disregarding modulo effects). The expression 2b + 4c thus increases by 6 – but remember that this is the same as subtracting 1 mod 7.

To subtract by 1 is exactly what is required for a normal year, since the weekday slips one day forward, we should compensate one day less to arrive at the correct weekday (i.e. Sunday). For a leap year, b becomes 0 and 2b thus is 0 instead of 8, which under mod 7 is another subtraction by 1, i.e., a total subtraction by 2, as the weekdays after the leap day that year slide forward by two days.

The expression 6d works the same way. Increasing d by some number y indicates that the full moon occurs y days later this year, and hence we should compensate y days less. Adding 6d is mod 7 the same as subtracting d, which is the desired operation. Thus, again, we do subtraction by adding under modulo arithmetic. In total, the variable e contains the step from the day after the day of the full moon to the nearest following Sunday, between 0 and 6 days ahead. The constant N provides the starting point for the calculations for each century and depends on where 1 January, year 1, was implicitly located when the Gregorian calendar was constructed.

The expression d + e can yield offsets in the range 0 to 3,5 pointing to possible Easter Sundays on 22 March to 26 April. For reasons of historical compatibility, all offsets of 35 and some of 34 are subtracted by 7, jumping one Sunday back to the day of the full moon (in effect using a negative e of −1). This means that 26 April is never Easter Sunday and that 19 April is overrepresented. These latter corrections are for historical reasons only and have nothing to do with the mathematical algorithm. The offset of 34 is adjusted if (and only if) d = 28 and d = 29 elsewhere in the 19-year cycle.

Using Gauss's Easter algorithm for years prior to 1583 is historically pointless since the Gregorian calendar was not utilised for determining Easter before that year. Using the algorithm far into the future is questionable, since we know nothing about how different churches will define Easter far ahead. Easter calculations are based on agreements and conventions, not on the actual celestial movements nor on indisputable facts of history.

=== Anonymous Gregorian algorithm ===
Original format of 1876 Nature submission
Dividend	Divisor	Quotient	Remainder
year	19	—N/a	a
year	100	b	c
b	4	d	e
b + 8	25	f	—N/a
b − f + 1	3	g	—N/a
19a + b − d − g + 15	30	—N/a	h
c	4	i	k
32 + 2e + 2i − h − k	7	—N/a	l
a + 11h + 22l	451	m	—N/a
h + l − 7m + 114	31	n	o

"A New York correspondent" submitted this algorithm for determining the Gregorian Easter to the journal Nature in 1876. It has been reprinted many times, e.g., in 1877 by Samuel Butcher in The Ecclesiastical Calendar, in 1916 by Arthur Downing in The Observatory, in 1922 by H. Spencer Jones in General Astronomy, in 1977 by the Journal of the British Astronomical Association, in 1977 by The Old Farmer's Almanac, in 1988 by Peter Duffett-Smith in Practical Astronomy with your Calculator, and in 1991 by Jean Meeus in Astronomical Algorithms. Because of the Meeus book citation, it is also called the "Meeus/Jones/Butcher" algorithm:

Variable	Expression	Y = 1961	2026	2027
a =	Y mod 19	4	12	13
b =	⌊Y/ 100⌋	19	20	20
c =	Y mod 100	61	26	27
d =	⌊b/ 4⌋	4	5	5
e =	b mod 4	3	0	0
f =	⌊(b + 8)/ 25⌋	1	1	1
g =	⌊(b − f + 1)/ 3⌋	6	6	6
h =	(19a + b − d − g + 15) mod 30	10	12	1
i =	⌊c/ 4⌋	15	6	6
k =	c mod 4	1	2	3
l =	(32 + 2e + 2i − h − k) mod 7	1	2	5
m =	⌊(a + 11h + 22l)/ 451⌋	0	0	0
n =	⌊(h + l − 7m + 114)/ 31⌋	4	4	3
o =	(h + l − 7m + 114) mod 31	1	4	27
Gregorian Easter		2 April 1961	5 April 2026	28 March 2027

In this algorithm, the variable n indicates the month of the year (either March for n = 3, or April for n = 4), while the day of the month is obtained as (o + 1). In 1961 the New Scientist published a version of the Nature algorithm incorporating a few changes. The variable g was calculated using Gauss's 1816 correction, resulting in the elimination of variable f. Some tidying results in the replacement of variable o (to which one must be added to obtain the date of Easter) with variable p, which gives the date directly.

Variable	Expression	Y = 1961	2026	2027
f	—N/a	—N/a	—N/a	—N/a
g =	⌊(8b + 13)/ 25⌋	6	6	6
m =	⌊(a + 11h + 19l)/ 433⌋	0	0	0
n =	⌊(h + l − 7m + 90)/ 25⌋	4	4	3
o	—N/a	—N/a	—N/a	—N/a
p =	(h + l − 7m + 33n + 19) mod 32	2	5	28
Gregorian Easter		2 April 1961	5 April 2026	28 March 2027

=== Meeus's Julian algorithm ===
Jean Meeus, in his book Astronomical Algorithms (1991, p. 69), presents the following algorithm for calculating the Julian Easter on the Julian Calendar. To obtain the date of Eastern Orthodox Easter according to the Gregorian Calendar (used as the civil calendar throughout most of the contemporary world), 13 days must be added to the Julian dates shown.

Orthodox (Eastern) Easter date
Variable	Expression	Y = 2008	2009	2010	2011	2016	2026	2027
a =	Y mod 4	0	1	2	3	0	2	3
b =	Y mod 7	6	0	1	2	0	3	4
c =	Y mod 19	13	14	15	16	2	12	13
d =	(19c + 15) mod 30	22	11	0	19	23	3	22
e =	(2a + 4b − d + 34) mod 7	1	4	0	1	4	5	6
	d + e + 114	137	129	114	134	141	122	142
month =	⌊(d + e + 114)/ 31⌋	4	4	3	4	4	3	4
day =	((d + e + 114) mod 31) + 1	14	6	22	11	18	30	19
Easter Day (Julian calendar)		14 April 2008	6 April 2009	22 March 2010	11 April 2011	18 April 2016	30 March 2026	19 April 2027
Gregorian calendar equivalent		27 April 2008	19 April 2009	4 April 2010	24 April 2011	1 May 2016	12 April 2026	2 May 2027

== See also ==
- Christian Zeller – German mathematician
- Crucifixion darkness – Christian gospel episode of darkened sky
- Reform of the date of Easter – Proposals to change the festival date
