= Modulus =

Modulus is the diminutive from the Latin word modus meaning measure or manner. It, or its plural moduli, may refer to the following:

== Physics and engineering ==
- Moduli (physics), scalar fields for which the potential energy function has continuous families of global minima
- The measurement of standard pitch in the teeth of a rotating gear
- Bulk modulus, a measure of compression resistance
- Elastic modulus, a measure of stiffness
- Shear modulus, a measure of elastic stiffness
- Young's modulus, a specific elastic modulus
- Casting modulus used in Chvorinov's rule.

== Computing ==
- Modulus (digital counter), the number of states in a counter's count sequence
- Modulo operation (a % b, mod(a, b), etc.), in both math and programming languages; results in remainder of a division

== Mathematics ==
- Modulus, the absolute value of a real or complex number ( |c| )
- Modulus (modular arithmetic), base of modular arithmetic
- Similarly, the modulus of a Dirichlet character
- Moduli space, in mathematics a geometric space whose points represent algebro-geometric objects
- Conformal modulus, a measure of the size of a curve family
- Modulus of continuity, a function gauging the uniform continuity of a function
- Similarly, modulus of convergence
- Modulus (algebraic number theory), a formal product of places of a number field
- The modular function in the theory of Haar measure, often called simply the modulus

== Other uses ==
- Modulus (gastropod) a genus of small sea snails
- Modulus Guitars, musical instrument manufacturer
- Modulus robot, a household robot

== See also ==
- Module (disambiguation)
- Modulo (disambiguation)
