= Mod =

Mod, MOD or mods may refer to:

== Places ==
- Modesto City–County Airport, Stanislaus County, California, US

== Arts, entertainment, and media ==
=== Music ===
- Mods (band), a Norwegian rock band
- M.O.D. (Method of Destruction), a band from New York City, US
- The Mods (band), a punk rock band from Toronto, Canada

=== Other uses in arts, entertainment, and media ===
- Manufactured on demand for CD, DVD distribution
- Mod (film), 2011
- The Mods (film), 2014
- Video game modding
- Mòd, a Scottish Gaelic festival
- Media-on-demand
- MuchOnDemand, a Canadian TV program

== Brands and enterprises ==
- Mod Club Theatre, Toronto, Canada
- MOD Pizza, US

== Organizations ==
- MoD, Ministry of defence of some countries
  - MoD (UK), Ministry of Defence
- Masters of Deception, a US hacker group
- Ministry of Development (Brunei)

== Science and technology ==
=== Computing and Internet ===
- Mod, a module for Apache HTTP Server
- Case modding of a computer
- Forum moderator, of an online forum
- Module file, a music file format
  - MOD (file format), the first module file format
- Modula-2 source code file extension
- Video game modding, a modification of a computer game

=== Mathematics ===
- Absolute value, also called modulus
- Mod n cryptanalysis, a partitioning attack applicable to block and stream ciphers
- Modulo (mathematics)
  - Modular arithmetic
  - Modulo operation
  - Modular exponentiation

=== Other uses in science and technology ===
- MOD., a science museum at the University of South Australia, Adelaide
- MOD and TOD, camcorder recording formats
- Modchip, a chip modifying an electronic system
- Model organism database, a biological database
- Moving object detection, a computing technology related to image processing
- Multiple organ dysfunction syndrome, a medical condition
- Pod mods, a type of electronic cigarette

== Other uses ==
- Mod (subculture), 1960s British youth subculture
  - Mod revival, late 1970s
- Honour Moderations, Oxford exams
- Maximum operating depth in scuba diving
- Mod Cup, a shinty trophy
- A module in modular scheduling
- Multicultural organization development
- Content moderation

== See also ==
- Mode (disambiguation)
- Modification (disambiguation)
- MODS (disambiguation)
- Module (disambiguation)
