= Maximal compact subgroup =

Concept in topology

In mathematics, a maximal compact subgroup K of a topological group G is a subgroup K that is a compact space, in the subspace topology, and maximal amongst such subgroups.

Maximal compact subgroups play an important role in the classification of Lie groups and especially semi-simple Lie groups. Maximal compact subgroups of Lie groups are not in general unique, but are unique up to conjugation – they are essentially unique.

== Example ==
An example would be the subgroup O(2), the orthogonal group, inside the general linear group GL(2, R). A related example is the circle group SO(2) inside SL(2, R). Evidently SO(2) inside GL(2, R) is compact and not maximal. The non-uniqueness of these examples can be seen as any inner product has an associated orthogonal group, and the essential uniqueness corresponds to the essential uniqueness of the inner product.

== Definition ==
A maximal compact subgroup is a maximal subgroup amongst compact subgroups – a maximal (compact subgroup) – rather than being (alternate possible reading) a maximal subgroup that happens to be compact; which would probably be called a compact (maximal subgroup), but in any case is not the intended meaning (and in fact maximal proper subgroups are not in general compact).

== Existence and uniqueness ==
The Cartan-Iwasawa-Malcev theorem asserts that every connected Lie group (and indeed every connected locally compact group) admits maximal compact subgroups and that they are all conjugate to one another. For a semisimple Lie group uniqueness is a consequence of the Cartan fixed point theorem, which asserts that if a compact group acts by isometries on a complete simply connected nonpositively curved Riemannian manifold then it has a fixed point.

Maximal compact subgroups of connected Lie groups are usually not unique, but they are unique up to conjugation, meaning that given two maximal compact subgroups K and L, there is an element g ∈ G such that gKg^{−1} = L. Hence a maximal compact subgroup is essentially unique, and people often speak of "the" maximal compact subgroup.

For the example of the general linear group GL(n, R), this corresponds to the fact that any inner product on R^{n} defines a (compact) orthogonal group (its isometry group) – and that it admits an orthonormal basis: the change of basis defines the conjugating element conjugating the isometry group to the classical orthogonal group O(n, R).

=== Proofs ===
For a real semisimple Lie group, Cartan's proof of the existence and uniqueness of a maximal compact subgroup can be found in Borel (1950) and Helgason (1978). Cartier (1955) and Hochschild (1965) discuss the extension to connected Lie groups and connected locally compact groups.

For semisimple groups, existence is a consequence of the existence of a compact real form of the noncompact semisimple Lie group and the corresponding Cartan decomposition. The proof of uniqueness relies on the fact that the corresponding Riemannian symmetric space G/K has negative curvature and Cartan's fixed point theorem. Mostow (1955) showed that the derivative of the exponential map at any point of G/K satisfies |d exp X| ≥ |X|. This implies that G/K is a Hadamard space, i.e. a complete metric space satisfying a weakened form of the parallelogram rule in a Euclidean space. Uniqueness can then be deduced from the Bruhat-Tits fixed point theorem. Indeed, any bounded closed set in a Hadamard space is contained in a unique smallest closed ball, the center of which is called its circumcenter. In particular a compact group acting by isometries must fix the circumcenter of each of its orbits.

=== Proof of uniqueness for semisimple groups ===
Mostow (1955) also related the general problem for semisimple groups to the case of GL(n, R). The corresponding symmetric space is the space of positive symmetric matrices. A direct proof of uniqueness relying on elementary properties of this space is given in Hilgert & Neeb (2012).

Let $\mathfrak{g}$ be a real semisimple Lie algebra with Cartan involution σ. Thus the fixed point subgroup of σ is the maximal compact subgroup K and there is an eigenspace decomposition

$$\displaystyle{\mathfrak{g}=\mathfrak{k}\oplus \mathfrak{p},}$$

where $\mathfrak{k}$, the Lie algebra of K, is the +1 eigenspace. The Cartan decomposition gives

$$\displaystyle{G=K\cdot \exp \mathfrak{p} = K\cdot P = P\cdot K.}$$

If B is the Killing form on $\mathfrak{g}$ given by B(X,Y) = Tr (ad X)(ad Y), then

$$\displaystyle{(X,Y)_\sigma=-B(X,\sigma(Y))}$$

is a real inner product on $\mathfrak{g}$. Under the adjoint representation, K is the subgroup of G that preserves this inner product.

If H is another compact subgroup of G, then averaging the inner product over H with respect to the Haar measure gives an inner product invariant under H. The operators Ad p with p in P are positive symmetric operators. This new inner produst can be written as

$$(S\cdot X,Y)_\sigma,$$

where S is a positive symmetric operator on $\mathfrak{g}$ such that Ad(h)^{t}S Ad h = S for h in H (with the transposes computed with respect to the inner product). Moreover, for x in G,

$$\displaystyle{\mathrm{Ad}\, \sigma(x)=(\mathrm{Ad}\,(x)^{-1})^t.}$$

So for h in H,

$$\displaystyle{S\circ \mathrm{Ad}(\sigma(h))= \mathrm{Ad}(h)\circ S.}$$

For X in $\mathfrak{p}$ define

$$\displaystyle{f(e^X)=\mathrm{Tr}\, \mathrm{Ad}(e^X) S.}$$

If e_{i} is an orthonormal basis of eigenvectors for S with Se_{i} = λ_{i} e_{i}, then

$$\displaystyle{f(e^X)=\sum \lambda_i (\mathrm{Ad}(e^X)e_i,e_i)_\sigma \ge (\min \lambda_i)\cdot \mathrm{Tr}\,e^{\mathrm{ad}\,X},}$$

so that f is strictly positive and tends to ∞ as |X| tends to ∞. In fact this norm is equivalent to the operator norm on the symmetric operators ad X and each non-zero eigenvalue occurs with its negative, since i ad X is a skew-adjoint operator on the compact real form $\mathfrak{k}\oplus i\mathfrak{p}$.

So f has a global minimum at Y say. This minimum is unique, because if Z were another then

$$\displaystyle{e^Z=e^{Y/2} e^X e^{Y/2},}$$

where X in $\mathfrak{p}$ is defined by the Cartan decomposition

$$\displaystyle{e^{Z/2}e^{-Y/2}=k\cdot e^{X/2}.}$$

If f_{i} is an orthonormal basis of eigenvectors of ad X with corresponding real eigenvalues μ_{i}, then

$$\displaystyle{g(t)= f(e^{Y/2} e^{tX} e^{Y/2})= \sum e^{\mu_i t} \|Ad(e^{Y/2})f_i\|^2_\sigma.}$$

Since the right hand side is a positive combination of exponentials, the real-valued function g is strictly convex if X ≠ 0, so has a unique minimum. On the other hand, it has local minima at t = 0 and t = 1, hence X = 0 and p = exp Y is the unique global minimum. By construction f(x) = f(σ(h)xh^{−1}) for h in H, so that p = σ(h)ph^{−1} for h in H. Hence σ(h)= php^{−1}. Consequently, if g = exp Y/2, gHg^{−1} is fixed by σ and therefore lies in K.

== Applications ==
=== Representation theory ===
Maximal compact subgroups play a basic role in the representation theory when G is not compact. In that case a maximal compact subgroup K is a compact Lie group (since a closed subgroup of a Lie group is a Lie group), for which the theory is easier.

The operations relating the representation theories of G and K are restricting representations from G to K, and inducing representations from K to G, and these are quite well understood; their theory includes that of spherical functions.

=== Topology ===
The algebraic topology of the Lie groups is also largely carried by a maximal compact subgroup K. To be precise, a connected Lie group is a topological product (though not a group theoretic product) of a maximal compact K and a Euclidean space – G = K × R^{d} – thus in particular K is a deformation retract of G, and is homotopy equivalent, and thus they have the same homotopy groups. Indeed, the inclusion $K \hookrightarrow G$ and the deformation retraction $G \twoheadrightarrow K$ are homotopy equivalences.

For the general linear group, this decomposition is the QR decomposition, and the deformation retraction is the Gram-Schmidt process. For a general semisimple Lie group, the decomposition is the Iwasawa decomposition of G as G = KAN in which K occurs in a product with a contractible subgroup AN.

== See also ==
- Hyperspecial subgroup
- Complex Lie group
