= MODS =

MODS may refer to:

- Metadata Object Description Schema, a bibliographic description schema
- Microscopic Observation Drug Susceptibility assay
- Multiple organ dysfunction syndrome
- Microsoft Office Document Scanning
- Military Orbital Development System, created by the US Air Force Space System Division
- Multiplexed Optical Data Storage
- Museum of Discovery and Science, in Fort Lauderdale, Florida, US
- Model Organism Databases, databases that house and disseminate organism-specific biological knowledge

== See also ==
- Mod (disambiguation)
