= Modification =

Modification may refer to:

- Modifications of school work for students with special educational needs
- Modifications (genetics), changes in appearance arising from changes in the environment
- Posttranslational modifications, changes to proteins arising from protein biosynthesis
- Modding, modifying hardware or software
  - Mod (video gaming)
  - Modified car
- Body modification
- Grammatical modifier
- Home modifications
- Chemical modification, processes involving the alteration of the chemical constitution or structure of molecules

== See also ==
- Modified (disambiguation)
- Modifier (disambiguation)
- Mod (disambiguation)
- Edit (disambiguation)
- Manipulation (disambiguation)
