= Essentially unique =

In mathematics, the term essentially unique is used to describe a weaker form of uniqueness, where an object satisfying a property is "unique" only in the sense that all objects satisfying the property are equivalent to each other. The notion of essential uniqueness presupposes some form of "sameness", which is often formalized using an equivalence relation.

A related notion is a universal property, where an object is not only essentially unique, but unique up to a unique isomorphism (meaning that it has trivial automorphism group). In general there can be more than one isomorphism between examples of an essentially unique object.

== Examples ==
=== Set theory ===
At the most basic level, there is an essentially unique set of any given cardinality, whether one labels the elements $\{1,2,3\}$ or $\{a,b,c\}$. In this case, the non-uniqueness of the isomorphism (e.g., match 1 to $a$ or 1 to $c$) is reflected in the symmetric group.

On the other hand, there is an essentially unique totally ordered set of any given finite cardinality that is unique up to unique isomorphism: if one writes $\{1 < 2 < 3\}$ and $\{a< b< c\}$, then the only order-preserving isomorphism is the one which maps 1 to $a$, 2 to $b$, and 3 to $c$.

=== Number theory ===
The fundamental theorem of arithmetic establishes that the factorization of any positive integer into prime numbers is essentially unique, i.e., unique up to the ordering of the prime factors.

=== Group theory ===
In the context of classification of groups, there is an essentially unique group containing exactly 2 elements. Similarly, there is also an essentially unique group containing exactly 3 elements: the cyclic group of order three. In fact, regardless of how one chooses to write the three elements and denote the group operation, all such groups can be shown to be isomorphic to each other, and hence are "the same".

On the other hand, there does not exist an essentially unique group with exactly 4 elements, as there are in this case two non-isomorphic groups in total: the cyclic group of order 4 and the Klein four-group.

=== Measure theory ===
There is an essentially unique measure that is translation-invariant, strictly positive and locally finite on the real line. In fact, any such measure must be a constant multiple of Lebesgue measure, specifying that the measure of the unit interval should be 1—before determining the solution uniquely.

=== Topology ===
There is an essentially unique two-dimensional, compact, simply connected manifold: the 2-sphere. In this case, it is unique up to homeomorphism.

In the area of topology known as knot theory, there is an analogue of the fundamental theorem of arithmetic: the decomposition of a knot into a sum of prime knots is essentially unique.

=== Lie theory ===
A maximal compact subgroup of a semisimple Lie group may not be unique, but is unique up to conjugation.

=== Category theory ===
An object that is the limit or colimit over a given diagram is essentially unique, as there is a unique isomorphism to any other limiting/colimiting object.

=== Coding theory ===
Given the task of using 24-bit words to store 12 bits of information in such a way that 4-bit errors can be detected and 3-bit errors can be corrected, the solution is essentially unique: the extended binary Golay code.

== See also ==
- Classification theorem
- Modulo, a mathematical term pertaining to the equivalence of objects
- Universal property
- Up to
