= Modifier =

Modifier may refer to:

- Grammatical modifier, a word that modifies the meaning of another word or limits its meaning
  - Compound modifier, two or more words that modify a noun
  - Dangling modifier, a word or phrase that modifies a clause in an ambiguous manner
- Modifier key, a kind of key on a computer keyboard that changes the semantics of other keys (e.g. the shift key)
- In 3D computer graphics, an attribute that modifies a polygonal mesh to change its geometry, but preserves the original vertex data
- Car tuner, one who modifies the performance or appearance of a vehicle
- Alphanumeric or numeric two-digit characters used to indicate certain circumstances or changes made to procedural, surgical, service, and supplies codes in the HCPCS clinical coding system
- Light modifier, tools or accessories employed in photography and videography to shape, control, or direct light emitted from a light source. These modifiers serve to alter the quality, direction, and intensity of light, thereby enabling photographers and videographers to achieve specific effects or moods in their images. Light modifiers come in various categories and types, each with its own unique characteristics and applications.

== See also ==
- Modification (disambiguation)
- Modified (disambiguation)
- Single-word modifier (disambiguation)
