= Single-word modifier =

A single-word modifier is one word that modifies the meaning of another word, phrase or clause.

Single-word modifier may refer to:

- Grammatical modifier, a word which modifies another element of the phrase or clause
- Adjective, a word which modifies a noun or pronoun
- Adverb, a word which modifies a verb, adjective, or other word or phrase

== See also ==
- Modifier (disambiguation)
- Compound modifier
