= Modified =

Modified may refer to:

- Modified (album), the second full-length album by Save Ferris
- Modified racing, or "Modifieds", an American automobile racing genre
- Changes of the premiership of Narendra Modi

== See also ==
- Modification (disambiguation)
- Modifier (disambiguation)
