= Practical Astronomy with Your Calculator =

Book by Peter Duffett-Smith

Practical Astronomy with your Calculator
- First edition
- Author: Peter Duffett Smith
- Subject: Astronomy
- Publisher: Cambridge University Press
- Publication date: 1979
- Pages: 185
- ISBN: 0-521-35629-6

Practical Astronomy with your Calculator is a book written by Peter Duffett-Smith, a University Lecturer and a Fellow of Downing College. It was first published in 1979 and has been in publication for over 30 years. The book teaches how to solve astronomical calculations with a pocket calculator. The book covers topics such as time, coordinate systems, the Sun, planetary systems, binary stars, the Moon and eclipses. The third edition features new sections on generalised coordinate transformations, nutation, aberration, and selenographic coordinates. The fourth edition, coauthored by Jonathan Zwart, adds "or Spreadsheet" to the end of the title.

The book has been used by amateur astronomers and those studying introductory astronomy. It was written because of a suggestion by Dr. Anthony Winter.

== Modern use ==
The mathematical operations used in the book are subtraction, addition, multiplication, division and trigonometric functions. Angles are illustrated in degrees and not radians. The calculations are carried out on a calculator. The book "explains in simpler terms the equations used to calculate almanac data."

== Critical reception ==
The Cambridge Guide to Astronomical Discovery states that Practical Astronomy with your Calculator is a "must"-have book if one has no personal computer for astronomical calculations. New Scientist magazine gave a favourable review of the book, although stating that there were small errors in some calculations. Archaeoastronomy states "the book is recommended as easy to use and reliable."
