= Hyperspecial subgroup =

In the theory of reductive groups over local fields, a hyperspecial subgroup of a reductive group G is a certain type of compact subgroup of G.

In particular, let F be a nonarchimedean local field, O its ring of integers, k its residue field and G a reductive group over F. A subgroup K of G(F) is called hyperspecial if there exists a smooth group scheme Γ over O such that

- Γ_{F}=G,
- Γ_{k} is a connected reductive group, and
- Γ(O)=K.

The original definition of a hyperspecial subgroup (appearing in section 1.10.2 of) was in terms of hyperspecial points in the Bruhat–Tits building of G. The equivalent definition above is given in the same paper of Tits, section 3.8.1.

Hyperspecial subgroups of G(F) exist if, and only if, G is unramified over F.

An interesting property of hyperspecial subgroups, is that among all compact subgroups of G(F), the hyperspecial subgroups have maximum measure.
