= Modulus robot =

Household robot

Modulus is a household robot developed by Sirius, a company founded by Massimo Giuliana in 1982 to market home and personal computers. In 1984, Sirius began developing its own domestic robot, leading to the creation of the first Modulus prototype. Following the initial prototype, Japanese designer Isao Hosoe, who was based in Milan, was commissioned to design the robot’s exterior and later contributed to a broader technological redesign. The electronic and mechanical components were designed and manufactured by Data Process, while the software was developed with the assistance of the U.S.-based RB Robot Corporation, founded by Joseph H. Bosworth.

== Development ==
Two million dollars were invested in developing this particular piece of equipment. Research carried out in the United States showed that there would be greater development in this sector. It was also estimated that the use of "Modulus" could provide an opportunity to bring back into operation many PCs that were bought during the boom, but which are not used seldom, if ever. A good slice of the "Modulus" market could consist of the owners of these personal computers, newly aware of the possibility of connecting them to a personal robot.

"Modulus" was designed as a robot with possible domestic applications, but in reality it is open to any future development. Modularity - hence its name - is one of its principal characteristics, and it has been designed for adaptation to the widest possible range of applications. Comparing the robot with man, "Modulus" can be said to have an electronic "circulatory system" that permits the various extremities (arms, head, etc.) to communicate with the brain (CPU in a computer). The "Modulus" robots could have abilities such as a phonemes synthesizer, voice recognition, infrared communication, etc., making it suitable for performing many functions ranging from helping to teach children to assisting the handicapped or invalids.

When studying the eventual appearance of "Modulus", Isao Hosoe began by looking at the robots of the past. These included "Electro", built by Westinghouse in 1939. Hosoe hit on the right appearance by studying human expressions and gestures, bearing in mind that a domestic robot needs to be appealing on account of its proximity to man. Its eyelids have to open, its pupils dilate or contract. It must be able to nod or shake its head, bend its torso, and raise, lower and rotate its arms. "Modulus", however, has no feet. Available in three configurations - "Base", "Service & Security" and "Moddy" - "Modulus" stands on a Base unit 35 cm in diameter and 15 cm high, two two-speed motors connected to rubber wheels, and two spherical stabilizers. It comes with a small infrared Instrument for connecting it to another remote control device or for interacting with the major home and personal computers.

== Base ==
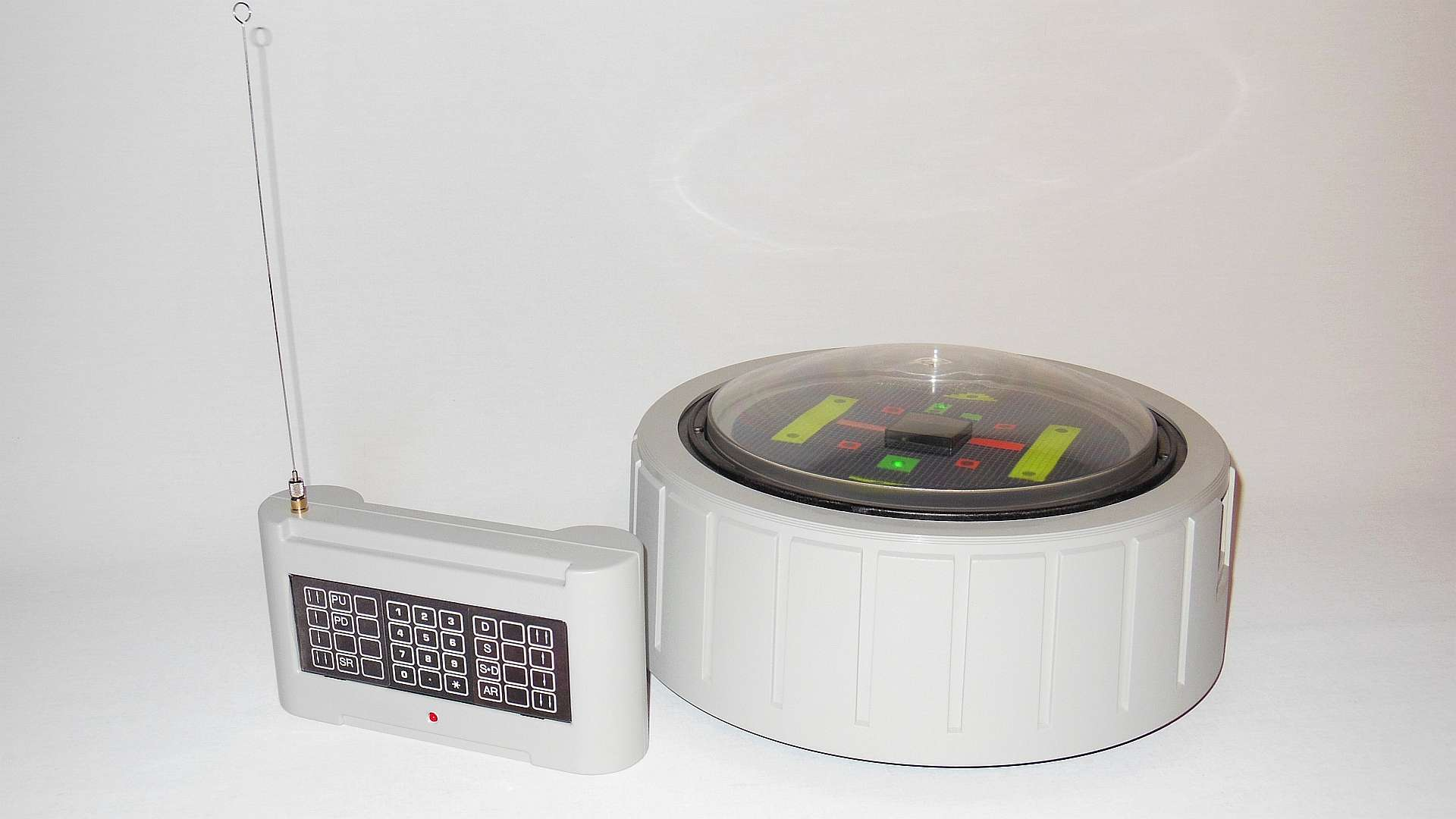
The Base version of the Modulus robot.

This first unit can be added to for different functions. As it stands it can be used in hobbies as a home computer, self-propelled peripheral, and can be useful for people wanting to learn to program robots. The simplest attachments which can be connected to the Base unit are a vacuum cleaner and a plotter-mechanism that uses felt pens, etc., to produce drawings of considerable precision.

== Service & Security ==
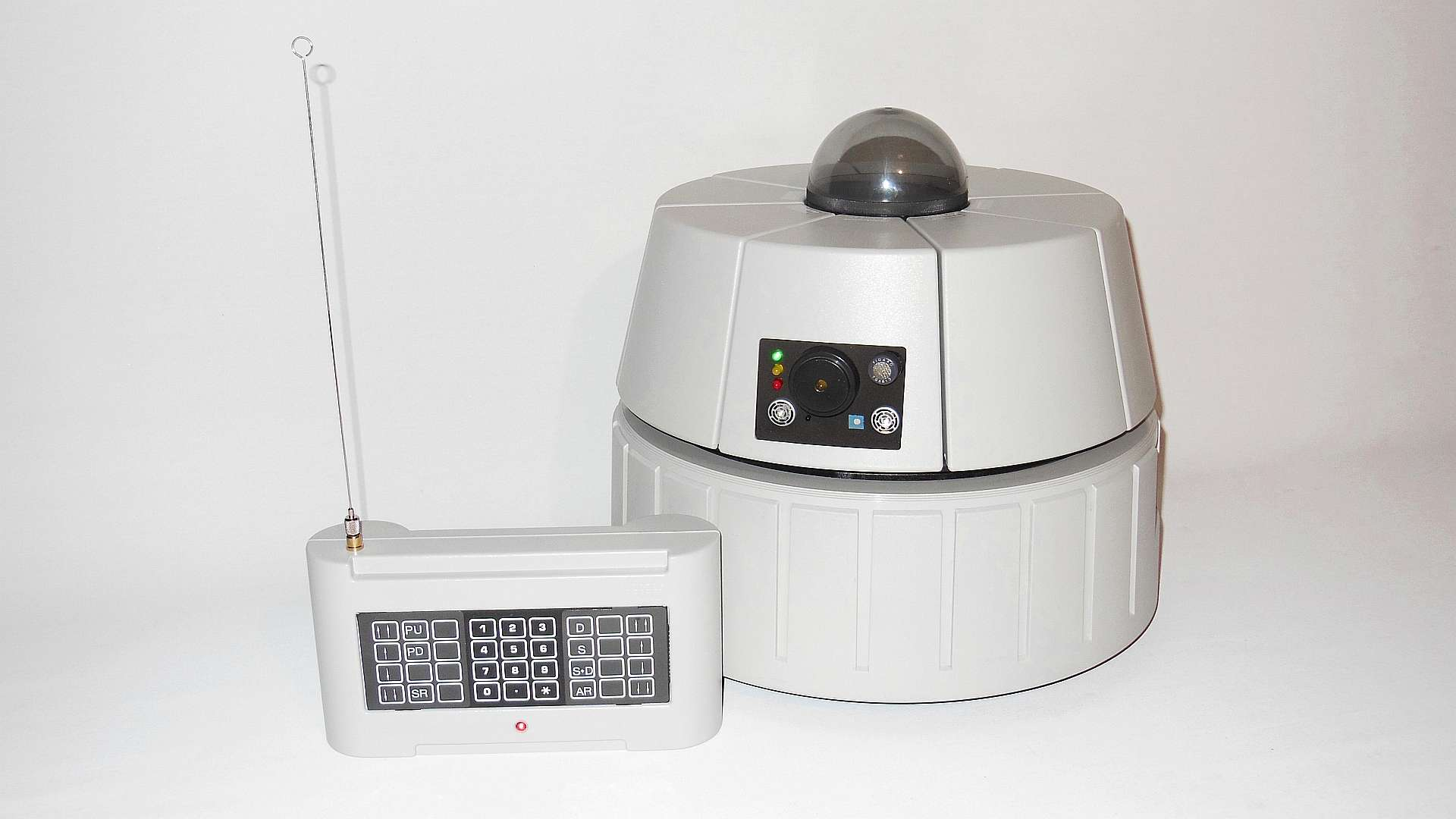
The Service & Security version of the Modulus robot.

The second "Modulus" configuration, the Service Robot, is obtained by fitting the Techno-cake home-security and service unit on to the Base. One of the components allow the robot to signal the presence of smoke, gas, water, and intruders; at the first sign of danger it informs the computer or triggers a siren or preset vocal message. An arm with ample freedom of movement and considerable gripping power can be added to the Service Robot. Using its meteo-system, the robot will fetch its owners umbrella if it is going to rain; a simple whistle will bring it toddling over to you.

== Moddy ==
Moddy is the third and most advanced version of the robot. It is obtained by adding a torso, two arms, and a head to the other two units. The robot can carry a tray with its two arms. Its head and big eyes give it an anthropomorphic character. Its designers include Isao Hosoe, Ann Marinelli, Donato Greco, and Alessio Pozzoli.

The first two units were previously available on the market. Base complete with vacuum cleaner and plotter-mechanism cost about a million lire, while the price of the Techno-Cake varied from two to five million lire, depending on the type and number of components in function (not all the components were available yet, on account of the time needed to develop the software). It would probably take up to a year before Moddy was ready, which would cost between eight and ten million lire, but unfortunately the "Modulus" project became too expensive, causing the bankruptcy of Sirius before Moddy could be completed. Some of the robots were later sold to companies who distributed them for the aid of handicapped while many of the Moddy robots were later sold by Arngren Electronics A/S during the early 1990s.
