= Module =

Module, modular and modularity may refer to the concept of modularity. They may also refer to:

== Computer science and engineering ==
- Modular design, the engineering discipline of designing complex devices using separately designed sub-components
- Modular function deployment, a method in systems engineering and product development
- Module, a measure of a gear's pitch
- Ontology modularization, a methodological principle in ontology engineering

=== Computer software ===
- Modular programming, a software design technique
  - Java Platform Module System
  - Modules (C++)
- Module SQL
- Loadable kernel module, an object file that contains code to extend the running kernel
- Environment Modules, a software tool designed to help users manage their Unix or Linux shell environment
- Modula-2 or Modula-3, programming languages which stress the use of modules

=== Computer hardware ===
- Computer module, an early packaging technique that combined several electronic components to produce a single logic element
- Memory module, a physical "stick" of RAM, an essential piece of computer hardware
- Multi-chip module, a modern technique that combines several complex computer chips into a single larger unit

== Science and mathematics ==
- Module (mathematics) over a ring, a generalization of vector spaces
- G-module over a group G, in mathematics
- Modular lattice a kind of partially ordered set
- Modularity theorem (formerly Taniyama–Shimura conjecture), a connection between elliptic curves and modular forms
- Module, in connection with modular decomposition of a graph, a kind of generalisation of graph components
- Modularity (networks), a benefit function that measures the quality of a division of a Complex network into communities
- Protein module or protein domain, a section of a protein with its own distinct conformation, often conserved in evolution
- A cis-regulatory module, a stretch of DNA containing a number of genes that share joint regulation by the same transcription factors

== Music ==
- Module (musician), the solo project of New Zealand-based musician/producer Jeramiah Ross
- Module file, a family of music file formats
- Modular Recordings, a record label
- Modular synthesizer, a type of electronic musical instrument
- Sound module, electronic musical instrument without a human-playable interface

== Other uses ==
- Modular building: prefabricated building that consists of repeated sections called modules, used as house or other, some of them open source, in this case, open source hardware.
- NTC Module, a Russian research and development center
- ModulArt, a technique used in contemporary art where a large-structure painting is made up of multiple smaller modules.
- Ford Modular engine, Ford's line of OHC V8 and V10 motors
- Volvo Modular engine
- Game module or expansion, an add-on publication for a role-playing game
  - Adventure (Dungeons & Dragons), formerly referred to as a module
- Vitruvian module, an architectural measure
- A class, course, or unit of education covering a single topic
- Modular AI, an American company

== See also ==
- Modulus (disambiguation)
- Atomicity (disambiguation)
- Modul University Vienna
- Modulon
