= Modulo =

Computational operation

In mathematics and computing, modulo is the binary operation of which the value is the remainder or signed remainder of a division of one number by another, the latter being called the modulus of the operation.

Given two positive numbers a and m, a modulo m (often written as $a \bmod m$) is the remainder of the Euclidean division of a by m, where a is the dividend and m is the divisor.

For example, $5 \bmod 2 = 1$, because dividing 5 by 2 yields a remainder of 1 (besides the quotient of 2), while $9 \bmod 3 = 0$, because 3 divides evenly into 9, thus leaving a remainder of 0.

In computing, although the modulo operation is typically applied with both of its arguments, a and m, being integers, many systems now allow other types of numeric operands. When they are both integers, the range of values for $a \bmod m$ is from 0 to $m - 1$, inclusive. The value of $a \bmod 1$ is always 0, for any integer a. When exactly one of a or m is negative, the basic definition breaks down, and programming languages differ in how these values are defined.

== Variants of the definition ==
In mathematics, the value of an expression $a \bmod m$ is, technically, an equivalence class, and any member of the class may be chosen as representative; however, the usual representative is the least positive residue, the smallest non-negative integer that belongs to that class (i.e., the remainder of the Euclidean division). For example, $11 \bmod 3$ equals not 2 (the least positive residue), but the entire set $\{..., {-}4, {-}1, 2, 5, 8, 11, 14, ...\}$ of all integers that are congruent to 2 modulo 3 (which is to say those integers that are 2 more than a multiple of 3). This equivalence class would typically be denoted by $[2]$.

However, other conventions are possible. Computers and calculators have various ways of storing and representing numbers; thus their definition of the modulo operation depends on the programming language or the underlying hardware.

In nearly all computing systems, the quotient q and the remainder r of a divided by $n \neq 0$ satisfy the following conditions:

$$\begin{align} &q \in \mathbb{Z} \\ &a = n q + r \quad (n \neq 0) \\ &|r| < |n| \end{align}$$	1

This still leaves a sign ambiguity if the remainder is non-zero: two possible choices for the remainder occur, one negative and the other positive; that choice determines which of the two consecutive quotients must be used to satisfy equation (1). In number theory, the positive remainder is always chosen, but in computing, programming languages choose depending on the language and the signs of a or n. (Note: Mathematically, these two choices are but two of the infinite number of choices available for the inequality satisfied by a remainder.) Standard Pascal and ALGOL 68, for example, give a positive remainder (or 0) even for negative divisors, and some programming languages, such as C90, leave it to the implementation when either of n or a is negative (see the table under § In programming languages for details). Some systems leave a modulo 0 undefined, though others define it as a.

- Quotient (q) and remainder (r) as functions of dividend (a), using truncated division
  Many implementations use truncated division, for which the quotient is defined by
  $$q = \operatorname{trunc}\left(\frac{a}{n}\right)$$
  where $\operatorname{trunc}$ is the integral part function (rounding toward zero), i.e. the truncation to zero significant digits. Thus according to equation (1), the remainder has the same sign as the dividend a so can take 2|n| − 1 values:
  $$r = a - n \operatorname{trunc}\left(\frac{a}{n}\right)$$
- Quotient and remainder using floored division
  Donald Knuth promotes floored division, for which the quotient is defined by
  $$q = \left\lfloor\frac{a}{n}\right\rfloor$$
  where $\lfloor\,\rfloor$ is the floor function (rounding down). Thus according to equation (1), the remainder has the same sign as the divisor n:
  $$r = a - n \left\lfloor\frac{a}{n}\right\rfloor$$
- Quotient and remainder using Euclidean division
  Raymond T. Boute promotes Euclidean division, for which the non-negative remainder $r \in \{0, 1, 2...\}$ is defined by
  $$r := a - nq \ \mathrm{such\ that} \ {\color{red}{0 \leq r}} < |n|.$$
  (Emphasis added.) Under this definition, we can say the following about the quotient $q$:
  $$\begin{align}
q &= \frac{a - r}{n} \in \mathbb{Z} \\
&= \text{sgn}(n) \cdot \frac{a-r}{|n|} \\
&= \text{sgn}(n) \cdot \left( \frac{a}{|n|} - \frac{r}{|n|} \right) \\
&= \text{sgn}(n) \cdot \left\lfloor \frac{a}{\left|n\right|} \right\rfloor
\end{align}$$
  where sgn is the sign function, $\lfloor\,\rfloor$ is the floor function (rounding down), and $\frac{a}{|n|} \in \mathbb{Q}$, $\frac{r}{|n|} \in \mathbb{Q}$ are rational numbers.
  Equivalently, one may instead define the quotient $q \in \mathbb{Z}$ as follows:
  $$q := \sgn(n) \left\lfloor\frac{a}{\left|n\right|}\right\rfloor =
\begin{cases}
\left\lfloor\frac{a}{n}\right\rfloor & \text{if } n > 0 \\
\left\lceil\frac{a}{n}\right\rceil   & \text{if } n < 0 \\
\end{cases}$$
  where $\lceil\,\rceil$ is the ceiling function (rounding up). Thus according to equation (1), the remainder $r$ is non-negative:
  $$r = a - nq = a - |n| \left\lfloor\frac{a}{\left|n\right|}\right\rfloor$$
- Quotient and remainder using rounded division
  Common Lisp and IEEE 754 use rounded division, for which the quotient is defined by
  $$q = \operatorname{round}\left(\frac{a}{n}\right)$$
  where round is the round function (rounding half to even). Thus according to equation (1), the remainder falls between $-\frac{n}{2}$ and $\frac{n}{2}$, and its sign depends on which side of zero it falls to be within these boundaries:
  $$r = a - n \operatorname{round}\left(\frac{a}{n}\right)$$
- Quotient and remainder using ceiling division
  Common Lisp also uses ceiling division, for which the quotient is defined by
  $$q = \left\lceil\frac{a}{n}\right\rceil$$
  where ⌈⌉ is the ceiling function (rounding up). Thus according to equation (1), the remainder has the opposite sign of that of the divisor:
  $$r = a - n \left\lceil\frac{a}{n}\right\rceil$$

If both the dividend and divisor are positive, then the truncated, floored, and Euclidean definitions agree. If the dividend is positive and the divisor is negative, then the truncated and Euclidean definitions agree. If the dividend is negative and the divisor is positive, then the floored and Euclidean definitions agree. If both the dividend and divisor are negative, then the truncated and floored definitions agree.

However, truncated division satisfies the identity $({-a})/b = {-(a/b)} = a/({-b})$.

== Notation ==
Some calculators have a mod() function button, and many programming languages have a similar function, expressed as mod(a, n), for example. Some also support expressions that use "%", "mod", or "Mod" as a modulo or remainder operator, such as a % n or a mod n.

For environments lacking a similar function, any of the three definitions above can be used.

== Common pitfalls ==
When the result of a modulo operation has the sign of the dividend (truncated definition), it can lead to surprising mistakes.

For example, to test if an integer is odd, one might be inclined to test if the remainder by 2 is equal to 1:

bool is_odd(int n) {
    return n % 2 == 1;
}

But in a language where modulo has the sign of the dividend, that is incorrect, because when n (the dividend) is negative and odd, n mod 2 returns −1, and the function returns false.

One correct alternative is to test that the remainder is not 0 (because remainder 0 is the same regardless of the signs):

bool is_odd(int n) {
    return n % 2 != 0;
}

Or with the binary arithmetic:

bool is_odd(int n) {
    return n & 1;
}

== Performance issues ==
Modulo operations might be implemented such that a division with a remainder is calculated each time. For special cases, on some hardware, faster alternatives exist. For example, the modulo of powers of 2 can alternatively be expressed as a bitwise AND operation (assuming x is a positive integer, or using a non-truncating definition):

x % 2^{n} == x & (2^{n} - 1)

Examples:

x % 2 == x & 1
x % 4 == x & 3
x % 8 == x & 7

In devices and software that implement bitwise operations more efficiently than modulo, these alternative forms can result in faster calculations.

Compiler optimizations may recognize expressions of the form expression % constant where constant is a power of two and automatically implement them as expression & (constant-1), allowing the programmer to write clearer code without compromising performance. This simple optimization is not possible for languages in which the result of the modulo operation has the sign of the dividend (including C), unless the dividend is of an unsigned integer type. This is because, if the dividend is negative, the modulo will be negative, whereas expression & (constant-1) will always be positive. For these languages, the equivalence x % 2^{n} == x < 0 ? x | ~(2^{n} - 1) : x & (2^{n} - 1) has to be used instead, expressed using bitwise OR, NOT and AND operations.

Optimizations for general constant-modulus operations also exist by calculating the division first using the constant-divisor optimization.

== Properties (identities) ==
Some modulo operations can be factored or expanded similarly to other mathematical operations. This may be useful in cryptography proofs, such as the Diffie–Hellman key exchange. The properties involving multiplication, division, and exponentiation generally require that a and n are integers.

- Identity:
  - (a mod n) mod n = a mod n.
  - n^{x} mod n = 0 for all positive integer values of x.
  - If p is a prime number which is not a divisor of b, then ab^{p−1} mod p = a mod p, due to Fermat's little theorem.
- Inverse:
  - [(−a mod n) + (a mod n)] mod n = 0.
  - b^{−1} mod n denotes the modular multiplicative inverse, which is defined if and only if b and n are relatively prime, which is the case when the left hand side is defined: [(b^{−1} mod n)(b mod n)] mod n = 1.
- Distributive:
  - (a + b) mod n = [(a mod n) + (b mod n)] mod n.
  - ab mod n = [(a mod n)(b mod n)] mod n.
- Division (definition): a/b mod n = [(a mod n)(b^{−1} mod n)] mod n, when the right hand side is defined (that is when b and n are coprime), and undefined otherwise.
- Inverse multiplication: [(ab mod n)(b^{−1} mod n)] mod n = a mod n.

== Diophantine definition ==
For non-negative integers a, n and r, r = a mod n holds if and only if there are non-negative integers q and s with
$$a = nq + r \quad \text{and} \quad r + s + 1 = n,$$
since the second equation expresses $r < n$. The two equations can be combined into the single Diophantine equation
$$(a - nq - r)^2 + (r + s + 1 - n)^2 = 0,$$
so the graph of the modulo operation on the non-negative integers is a Diophantine set. The same equation determines the quotient q, so the graph of divmod is Diophantine as well. The equation has no solution for n = 0, in line with leaving a modulo 0 undefined. Since the modulo operation is computable, its graph being Diophantine also follows from the MRDP theorem.

== In programming languages ==
Modulo operators in various programming languages
Language	Operator	Integer	Floating-point	Definition
ABAP	MOD	Yes	Yes	Euclidean
ActionScript	%	Yes	Yes	Truncated
Ada	mod	Yes	No	Floored
Ada	rem	Yes	No	Truncated
ALGOL 68	÷×, ÷*, %×, %*, mod (Note: The revised report uses boldface to distinguish between keywords and identifiers, but permits other formats, including capitalization (e.g. MOD).)	Yes	No	Euclidean
AMPL	mod	Yes	No	Truncated
APL	| (Note: Argument order reverses, i.e., α|ω computes $\omega\bmod\alpha$, the remainder when dividing ω by α.)	Yes	Yes	Floored
AppleScript	mod	Yes	Yes	Truncated
AutoLISP	rem	Yes	Yes	Truncated
AWK	%	Yes	Yes	Truncated (same as fmod in C)
BASIC	Mod	Yes	No	Varies by implementation
bc	%	Yes	Yes	Truncated
C C++	%, div	Yes	No	Truncated (Note: C99 and C++11 define the behavior of % to be truncated. The standards before then leave the behavior implementation-defined.)
C C++	fmod (C) std::fmod (C++)	No	Yes	Truncated
C C++	remainder (C) std::remainder (C++)	No	Yes	Rounded
C#	%	Yes	Yes	Truncated
C#	Math.IEEERemainder	No	Yes	Rounded
Clarion	%	Yes	No	Truncated
Clean	rem	Yes	No	Truncated
Clojure	mod	Yes	No	Floored
Clojure	rem	Yes	No	Truncated
COBOL	FUNCTION MOD	Yes	No	Floored
COBOL	FUNCTION REM	Yes	Yes	Truncated
CoffeeScript	%	Yes	No	Truncated (same as JavaScript)
CoffeeScript	%%	Yes	No	Floored
ColdFusion	%, MOD	Yes	No	Truncated
Common Intermediate Language	rem (signed)	Yes	Yes	Truncated
Common Intermediate Language	rem.un (unsigned)	Yes	No	—N/a
Common Lisp	mod	Yes	Yes	Floored
Common Lisp	rem	Yes	Yes	Truncated
Crystal	%, modulo	Yes	Yes	Floored
Crystal	remainder	Yes	Yes	Truncated
CSS	mod()	Yes	Yes	Floored
CSS	rem()	Yes	Yes	Truncated
D	%	Yes	Yes	Truncated
Dart	%	Yes	Yes	Euclidean
Dart	remainder()	Yes	Yes	Truncated
dc	%	Yes	Yes	Truncated
Eiffel	\\	Yes	No	Truncated
Elixir	rem/2	Yes	No	Truncated
Elixir	Integer.mod/2	Yes	No	Floored
Elm	modBy	Yes	No	Floored
Elm	remainderBy	Yes	No	Truncated
Erlang	rem	Yes	No	Truncated
Erlang	math:fmod/2	No	Yes	Truncated (same as C)
Euphoria	remainder	Yes	Yes	Truncated
Euphoria	mod	Yes	Yes	Floored
F#	%	Yes	Yes	Truncated (same as C#)
F#	Math.IEEERemainder	No	Yes	Rounded
Factor	mod	Yes	Yes	Truncated
Factor	rem	Yes	Yes	Euclidean
FileMaker	Mod	Yes	No	Floored
Forth	mod	Yes	No	Implementation defined
Forth	fm/mod	Yes	No	Floored
Forth	sm/rem	Yes	No	Truncated
Fortran	mod	Yes	Yes	Truncated
Fortran	modulo	Yes	Yes	Floored
Frink	%, mod	Yes	Yes	Floored
Full BASIC	MOD	Yes	Yes	Floored
Full BASIC	REMAINDER	Yes	Yes	Truncated
GLSL	%	Yes	No	Undefined
GLSL	mod	No	Yes	Floored
GameMaker Studio (GML)	mod, %	Yes	No	Truncated
GDScript (Godot)	%	Yes	No	Truncated
GDScript (Godot)	posmod	Yes	No	Euclidean
GDScript (Godot)	fmod	No	Yes	Truncated
GDScript (Godot)	fposmod	No	Yes	Euclidean
Go	%	Yes	No	Truncated
Go	math.Mod	No	Yes	Truncated
Go	big.Int.Mod	Yes	No	Euclidean
Go	big.Int.Rem	Yes	No	Truncated
Groovy	%	Yes	No	Truncated
Haskell	mod	Yes	No	Floored
Haskell	rem	Yes	No	Truncated
Haskell	Data.Fixed.mod' (GHC)	No	Yes	Floored
Haxe	%	Yes	Yes	Truncated
HLSL	%	Yes	Yes	Undefined
J	|	Yes	No	Floored
Java	%	Yes	Yes	Truncated
Java	Integer.remainderUnsigned, Long.remainderUnsigned	Yes	No	—N/a
Java	Math.ceilMod, StrictMath.ceilMod	Yes	No	Ceiling
Java	Math.floorMod, StrictMath.floorMod	Yes	No	Floored
Java	Math.IEEEremainder, StrictMath.IEEEremainder	No	Yes	Rounded
Java	a.mod(b) (BigInteger)	Yes	No	Euclidean
Java	a.remainder(b) (BigInteger)	Yes	No	Truncated
Java	a.remainder(b), a.remainder(b, mathContext) (BigDecimal)	No	Yes	Truncated
JavaScript; TypeScript	%	Yes	Yes	Truncated
Julia	mod	Yes	Yes	Floored
Julia	%, rem	Yes	Yes	Truncated
Kotlin	%, rem	Yes	Yes	Truncated
Kotlin	mod	Yes	Yes	Floored
ksh	%	Yes	No	Truncated (same as POSIX sh)
ksh	fmod	No	Yes	Truncated
LabVIEW	mod	Yes	Yes	Truncated
LibreOffice	MOD	Yes	Yes	Floored
Logo	MODULO	Yes	No	Floored
Logo	REMAINDER	Yes	No	Truncated
Lua 5	%	Yes	Yes	Floored
Lua 4	mod(x,y)	Yes	Yes	Truncated
Liberty BASIC	MOD	Yes	No	Truncated
Mathcad	mod(x,y)	Yes	No	Floored
Maple	e mod m (by default), modp(e, m)	Yes	No	Euclidean
Maple	mods(e, m)	Yes	No	Rounded
Maple	frem(e, m)	Yes	Yes	Rounded
Mathematica	Mod[a, b]	Yes	Yes	Floored
MATLAB	mod	Yes	Yes	Floored
MATLAB	rem	Yes	Yes	Truncated
Maxima	mod	Yes	No	Floored
Maxima	remainder	Yes	No	Truncated
Maya Embedded Language	%	Yes	No	Truncated
Maya Embedded Language	fmod	No	Yes	Truncated (same as C)
Microsoft Excel	MOD	Yes	Yes	Floored
Minitab	MOD	Yes	No	Floored
Modula-2	MOD	Yes	No	Floored
Modula-2	REM	Yes	No	Truncated
MUMPS	#	Yes	No	Floored
Netwide Assembler (NASM, NASMX)	%, div (unsigned)	Yes	No	—N/a
Netwide Assembler (NASM, NASMX)	%% (signed)	Yes	No	Implementation-defined
Nim	mod	Yes	Yes	Truncated
Nim	floorMod	Yes	Yes	Floored
Oberon	MOD	Yes	No	Floored-like (Note: Divisor must be positive, otherwise undefined.)
Objective-C	%	Yes	No	Truncated (same as C99)
Object Pascal, Delphi	mod	Yes	No	Truncated
OCaml	mod, Int.rem	Yes	No	Truncated
OCaml	mod_float, Float.rem	No	Yes	Truncated
Occam	\	Yes	No	Truncated
Pascal (ISO-7185 and -10206)	mod	Yes	No	Euclidean-like (Note: As discussed by Boute, ISO Pascal's definitions of div and mod do not obey the Division Identity of D = d · (D / d) + D % d, and are thus fundamentally broken.)
Perl	%	Yes	No	Floored (Note: Perl usually uses arithmetic modulo operator that is machine-independent. For examples and exceptions, see the Perl documentation on multiplicative operators.)
Perl	POSIX::fmod	No	Yes	Truncated (same as C)
PHP	%	Yes	No	Truncated
PHP	fmod	No	Yes	Truncated
PIC BASIC Pro	\\	Yes	No	Truncated
PL/I	mod	Yes	No	Floored (ANSI PL/I)
PowerShell	%	Yes	No	Truncated
Programming Code (PRC)	MATH.OP - 'MOD; (\)'	Yes	No	Undefined
Progress	modulo	Yes	No	Truncated
Prolog	mod	Yes	No	Floored
Prolog	rem	Yes	No	Truncated
PureBasic	%	Yes	No	Truncated
PureBasic	Mod(x,y)	No	Yes	Truncated
PureScript	`mod`	Yes	No	Euclidean
Pure Data	%	Yes	No	Truncated (same as C)
Pure Data	mod	Yes	No	Floored
Python	%	Yes	Yes	Floored
Python	math.fmod	No	Yes	Truncated
Python	math.remainder	No	Yes	Rounded
Q#	%	Yes	No	Truncated
R	%%	Yes	Yes	Floored
Racket	modulo	Yes	Some (Note: Racket defines an integer as a rational number for which round produces the same number when applied. This includes some inexact numbers, like 42.0, but excludes others, like 3.14.)	Floored
Racket	remainder	Yes	Some	Truncated
Raku	%	No	Yes	Floored
Reason	mod	Yes	No	Truncated
Rexx	//	Yes	Yes	Truncated
RPG	%REM	Yes	No	Truncated
Ruby	%, modulo()	Yes	Yes	Floored
Ruby	remainder()	Yes	Yes	Truncated
Rust	%	Yes	Yes	Truncated
Rust	rem_euclid()	Yes	Yes	Euclidean
SAS	MOD	Yes	No	Truncated
Scala	%	Yes	Yes	Truncated
Scheme	modulo	Yes	No	Floored
Scheme	remainder	Yes	No	Truncated
Scheme R^{6}RS	mod	Yes	No	Euclidean
Scheme R^{6}RS	mod0	Yes	No	Rounded
Scheme R^{6}RS	flmod	No	Yes	Euclidean
Scheme R^{6}RS	flmod0	No	Yes	Rounded
Scratch	mod	Yes	Yes	Floored
Seed7	mod	Yes	Yes	Floored
Seed7	rem	Yes	Yes	Truncated
SenseTalk	modulo	Yes	No	Floored
SenseTalk	rem	Yes	No	Truncated
sh (POSIX) (includes bash, mksh, &c.)	%	Yes	No	Truncated (same as C)
Smalltalk	\\	Yes	Yes	Floored
Smalltalk	rem:	Yes	Yes	Truncated
Snap!	mod	Yes	No	Floored
Spin	//	Yes	No	Floored
Solidity	%	Yes	No	Truncated
SQL (SQL:1999)	mod(x,y)	Yes	No	Truncated
SQL (SQL:2011)	%	Yes	No	Truncated
Standard ML	mod	Yes	No	Floored
Standard ML	Int.rem	Yes	No	Truncated
Standard ML	Real.rem	No	Yes	Truncated
Stata	mod(x,y)	Yes	No	Euclidean
Swift	%	Yes	No	Truncated
Swift	remainder(dividingBy:)	No	Yes	Rounded
Swift	truncatingRemainder(dividingBy:)	No	Yes	Truncated
Tcl	expr a % n, ::tcl::mathop::% a n (Note: The expr command is defined independently of commands in the ::tcl::mathop namespace.)	Yes	No	Floored
Tcl	expr fmod(a, n), ::tcl::mathfunc::fmod a n (Note: The expr command is defined in terms of commands in the ::tcl::mathfunc namespace.)	No	Yes	Truncated (same as C)
tcsh	%	Yes	No	Truncated
Torque	%	Yes	No	Truncated
Turing	mod	Yes	No	Floored
Verilog (2001)	%	Yes	No	Truncated
VHDL	mod	Yes	No	Floored
VHDL	rem	Yes	No	Truncated
VimL	%	Yes	No	Truncated
Visual Basic	Mod	Yes	No	Truncated
WebAssembly	i32.rem_u, i64.rem_u (unsigned)	Yes	No	—N/a
WebAssembly	i32.rem_s, i64.rem_s (signed)	Yes	No	Truncated
x86 assembly	DIV (unsigned)	Yes	No	—N/a
x86 assembly	IDIV (signed)	Yes	No	Truncated
x86 assembly	FPREM	No	Yes	Truncated
x86 assembly	FPREM1	No	Yes	Rounded
XBase++	%	Yes	Yes	Truncated
XBase++	Mod()	Yes	Yes	Floored
Xojo	Mod	Yes	Partial (Note: Coerces floating-point operands to integers before calculating the result.)	Truncated
Zig	%, @rem	Yes	Yes	Truncated
Zig	@mod	Yes	Yes	Floored
Z3 Theorem Prover	div, mod	Yes	No	Euclidean

In addition, many computer systems provide a divmod functionality, which produces the quotient and the remainder at the same time. Examples include the x86 architecture's DIV and IDIV instructions, the C programming language's div() function, and Python's divmod() function.

== Generalizations ==
=== Modulo with offset ===
Sometimes it is useful for the result of a modulo n to lie not between 0 and n − 1, but between some number d and d + n − 1. In that case, d is called an offset and d = 1 is particularly common.

There does not seem to be a standard notation for this operation, so let us tentatively use a mod_{d} n. We thus have the following definition: x = a mod_{d} n just in case d ≤ x ≤ d + n − 1 and x mod n = a mod n. Clearly, the usual modulo operation corresponds to zero offset: a mod n = a mod_{0} n.

The operation of modulo with offset is related to the floor function as follows:
$$a \operatorname{mod}_d n = a - n \left\lfloor\frac{a-d}{n}\right\rfloor.$$

To see this, let $x = a - n \left\lfloor\frac{a-d}{n}\right\rfloor$. We first show that x mod n = a mod n. It is in general true that (a + bn) mod n = a mod n for all integers b; thus, this is true also in the particular case when $b = -\!\left\lfloor\frac{a-d}{n}\right\rfloor$; but that means that $x \bmod n = \left(a - n \left\lfloor\frac{a-d}{n}\right\rfloor\right)\! \bmod n = a \bmod n$, which is what we wanted to prove. It remains to be shown that d ≤ x ≤ d + n − 1. Let k and r be the integers such that a − d = kn + r with 0 ≤ r ≤ n − 1 (see Euclidean division). Then $\left\lfloor\frac{a-d}{n}\right\rfloor = k$, thus $x = a - n \left\lfloor\frac{a-d}{n}\right\rfloor = a - n k = d +r$. Now take 0 ≤ r ≤ n − 1 and add d to both sides, obtaining d ≤ d + r ≤ d + n − 1. But we've seen that x = d + r, so we are done.

The modulo with offset a mod_{d} n is implemented in Mathematica as Mod[a, n, d] .

=== Implementing other modulo definitions using truncation ===
Despite the mathematical elegance of Knuth's floored division and Euclidean division, it is generally much more common to find a truncated division-based modulo in programming languages. Leijen provides the following algorithms for calculating the two divisions given a truncated integer division:

/* Euclidean and Floored divmod, in the style of C's ldiv() */
typedef struct {
  /* This structure is part of the C stdlib.h, but is reproduced here for clarity */
  long int quot;
  long int rem;
} ldiv_t;

/* Euclidean division */
inline ldiv_t ldivE(long numer, long denom) {
  /* The C99 and C++11 languages define both of these as truncating. */
  long q = numer / denom;
  long r = numer % denom;
  if (r < 0) {
    if (denom > 0) {
      q = q - 1;
      r = r + denom;
    } else {
      q = q + 1;
      r = r - denom;
    }
  }
  return (ldiv_t){.quot = q, .rem = r};
}

/* Floored division */
inline ldiv_t ldivF(long numer, long denom) {
  long q = numer / denom;
  long r = numer % denom;
  if ((r > 0 && denom < 0) || (r < 0 && denom > 0)) {
    q = q - 1;
    r = r + denom;
  }
  return (ldiv_t){.quot = q, .rem = r};
}

For both cases, the remainder can be calculated independently of the quotient, but not vice versa. The operations are combined here to save screen space, as the logical branches are the same.

== See also ==
- Modulo (disambiguation) – many uses of the word modulo, all of which grew out of Carl F. Gauss' approach to modular arithmetic in 1801.
- Modulo (mathematics), general use of the term in mathematics
- Modular exponentiation
- Turn (angle)
