= List of things named after John von Neumann =

This is a list of things named after John von Neumann. John von Neumann (1903–1957), a mathematician, is the eponym of all of the things (and topics) listed below.

- Birkhoff–von Neumann algorithm
- Birkhoff–von Neumann theorem
  - Birkhoff–von Neumann decomposition
- Dirac–von Neumann axioms
- Jordan–von Neumann theorems
- Koopman–von Neumann classical mechanics
- von Neumann–Kakutani adding machine
- Schatten–von Neumann norm
- Stone–von Neumann theorem
- Taylor–von Neumann–Sedov blast wave
- von Neumann algebra
  - Abelian von Neumann algebra
  - Enveloping von Neumann algebra
  - Finite-dimensional von Neumann algebra
- von Neumann architecture
- JOHNNIAC
- von Neumann bicommutant theorem
- von Neumann bounded set
- von Neumann bornology
- Von Neumann bottleneck
- von Neumann cardinal assignment
- von Neumann cellular automaton
- von Neumann conjecture
- Murray–von Neumann coupling constant
- Jordan–von Neumann constant
- Von Neumann–Richtmyer method
- von Neumann's elephant
- von Neumann entropy
  - von Neumann entanglement entropy
- von Neumann equation
- von Neumann extractor
- von Neumann-Wigner interpretation
- von Neumann–Wigner theorem
- von Neumann measurement scheme
- von Neumann chain
- von Neumann mutual information
- von Neumann machines
- Von Neumann's mean ergodic theorem
- von Neumann neighborhood
- Von Neumann's no hidden variables proof
- von Neumann ordinal
- von Neumann paradox
- von Neumann probe
- von Neumann programming languages
- von Neumann regular ring
- von Neumann finite ring
- von Neumann spectral theorem
- von Neumann formulae
- von Neumann stability analysis
- von Neumann universal constructor
- von Neumann universe
- von Neumann–Bernays–Gödel set theory
- Jankov–von Neumann uniformization theorem
- von Neumann’s minimax theorem
- von Neumann–Morgenstern utility theorem
- von Neumann-Morgenstern solution
- von Neumann's inequality
- von Neumann's theorem
- von Neumann's trace inequality
- Weyl–von Neumann theorem
- Wigner-Von Neumann bound state in the continuum
- Wold–von Neumann decomposition
- Zel'dovich–von Neumann–Döring detonation model
  - von Neumann spike

== Other ==
- 22824 von Neumann
- IEEE John von Neumann Medal
- John von Neumann Award
- John von Neumann Center (JVNC), near Princeton, New Jersey, managed by the Consortium for Scientific Computing
- John von Neumann Computer Society
- John von Neumann Environmental Research Institute of the Pacific
- von Neumann (crater)
- John von Neumann Prize
- John von Neumann (sculpture)
- John von Neumann Theory Prize
