= Commutation theorem for traces =

Identifies the commutant of a specific von Neumann algebra

In mathematics, a commutation theorem for traces explicitly identifies the commutant of a specific von Neumann algebra acting on a Hilbert space in the presence of a trace.

The first such result was proved by Francis Joseph Murray and John von Neumann in the 1930s and applies to the von Neumann algebra generated by a discrete group or by the dynamical system associated with a measurable transformation preserving a probability measure.

Another important application is in the theory of unitary representations of unimodular locally compact groups, where the theory has been applied to the regular representation and other closely related representations. In particular this framework led to an abstract version of the Plancherel theorem for unimodular locally compact groups due to Irving Segal and Forrest Stinespring and an abstract Plancherel theorem for spherical functions associated with a Gelfand pair due to Roger Godement. Their work was put in final form in the 1950s by Jacques Dixmier as part of the theory of Hilbert algebras.

It was not until the late 1960s, prompted partly by results in algebraic quantum field theory and quantum statistical mechanics due to the school of Rudolf Haag, that the more general non-tracial Tomita–Takesaki theory was developed, heralding a new era in the theory of von Neumann algebras.

== Commutation theorem for finite traces ==
Let H be a Hilbert space and M a von Neumann algebra on H with a unit vector Ω such that

- M Ω is dense in H
- M ' Ω is dense in H, where M ' denotes the commutant of M
- (abΩ, Ω) = (baΩ, Ω) for all a, b in M.

The vector Ω is called a cyclic-separating trace vector. It is called a trace vector because the last condition means that the matrix coefficient corresponding to Ω defines a tracial state on M. It is called cyclic since Ω generates H as a topological M-module. It is called separating because if aΩ = 0 for a in M, then aM'Ω= (0), and hence a = 0.

It follows that the map

$$Ja\Omega=a^*\Omega$$

for a in M defines a conjugate-linear isometry of H with square the identity, J^{2} = I. The operator J is usually called the modular conjugation operator.

It is immediately verified that JMJ and M commute on the subspace M Ω, so that

$$JMJ\subseteq M^\prime.$$

The commutation theorem of Murray and von Neumann states that

$JMJ=M^\prime$

One of the easiest ways to see this is to introduce K, the closure of the real subspace M_{sa} Ω, where M_{sa} denotes the self-adjoint elements in M. It follows that

$$H=K\oplus iK,$$

an orthogonal direct sum for the real part of the inner product. This is just the real orthogonal decomposition for the ±1 eigenspaces of J. On the other hand for a in M_{sa} and b in M'_{sa}, the inner product (abΩ, Ω) is real, because ab is self-adjoint. Hence K is unaltered if M is replaced by M '.

In particular Ω is a trace vector for M' and J is unaltered if M is replaced by M '. So the opposite inclusion

$$JM^\prime J\subseteq M$$

follows by reversing the roles of M and M'.

=== Examples ===
- One of the simplest cases of the commutation theorem, where it can easily be seen directly, is that of a finite group Γ acting on the finite-dimensional inner product space $\ell^2(\Gamma)$ by the left and right regular representations λ and ρ. These unitary representations are given by the formulas $(\lambda(g) f)(x)=f(g^{-1}x),\,\,(\rho(g)f)(x)=f(xg)$ for f in $\ell^2(\Gamma)$ and the commutation theorem implies that $\lambda(\Gamma)^{\prime\prime} = \rho(\Gamma)^\prime, \,\, \rho(\Gamma)^{\prime\prime}=\lambda(\Gamma)^\prime.$ The operator J is given by the formula $Jf(g) = \overline{f(g^{-1})}.$ Exactly the same results remain true if Γ is allowed to be any countable discrete group. The von Neumann algebra λ(Γ)' ' is usually called the group von Neumann algebra of Γ.
- Another important example is provided by a probability space (X, μ). The Abelian von Neumann algebra A = L^{∞}(X, μ) acts by multiplication operators on H = L^{2}(X, μ) and the constant function 1 is a cyclic-separating trace vector. It follows that $A' = A,$ so that A is a maximal Abelian subalgebra of B(H), the von Neumann algebra of all bounded operators on H.
- The third class of examples combines the above two. Coming from ergodic theory, it was one of von Neumann's original motivations for studying von Neumann algebras. Let (X, μ) be a probability space and let Γ be a countable discrete group of measure-preserving transformations of (X, μ). The group therefore acts unitarily on the Hilbert space H = L^{2}(X, μ) according to the formula $U_g f(x) = f(g^{-1}x),$ for f in H and normalises the Abelian von Neumann algebra A = L^{∞}(X, μ). Let $H_1 = H\otimes \ell^2(\Gamma),$ a tensor product of Hilbert spaces. The group–measure space construction or crossed product von Neumann algebra $M = A \rtimes \Gamma$ is defined to be the von Neumann algebra on H_{1} generated by the algebra $A\otimes I$ and the normalising operators $U_g\otimes \lambda(g)$.
  The vector $\Omega=1\otimes \delta_1$ is a cyclic-separating trace vector. Moreover the modular conjugation operator J and commutant M ' can be explicitly identified.

One of the most important cases of the group–measure space construction is when Γ is the group of integers Z, i.e. the case of a single invertible measurable transformation T. Here T must preserve the probability measure μ. Semifinite traces are required to handle the case when T (or more generally Γ) only preserves an infinite equivalent measure; and the full force of the Tomita–Takesaki theory is required when there is no invariant measure in the equivalence class, even though the equivalence class of the measure is preserved by T (or Γ).

== Commutation theorem for semifinite traces ==
Let M be a von Neumann algebra and M_{+} the set of positive operators in M. By definition, a semifinite trace (or sometimes just trace) on M is a functional τ from M_{+} into [0, ∞] such that

1. $\tau(\lambda a + \mu b) = \lambda \tau(a) + \mu \tau(b)$ for a, b in M_{+} and λ, μ ≥ 0 (semilinearity);
2. $\tau\left(uau^*\right) = \tau(a)$ for a in M_{+} and u a unitary operator in M (unitary invariance);
3. τ is completely additive on orthogonal families of projections in M (normality);
4. each projection in M is as orthogonal direct sum of projections with finite trace (semifiniteness).

If in addition τ is non-zero on every non-zero projection, then τ is called a faithful trace.

If τ is a faithful trace on M, let H = L^{2}(M, τ) be the Hilbert space completion of the inner product space

$$M_0 = \left\{a \in M \mid \tau\left(a^*a\right) < \infty\right\}$$

with respect to the inner product

$$(a, b) = \tau\left(b^*a\right).$$

The von Neumann algebra M acts by left multiplication on H and can be identified with its image. Let

$$Ja = a^*$$

for a in M_{0}. The operator J is again called the modular conjugation operator and extends to a conjugate-linear isometry of H satisfying J^{2} = I. The commutation theorem of Murray and von Neumann

$JMJ = M^\prime$

is again valid in this case. This result can be proved directly by a variety of methods, but follows immediately from the result for finite traces, by repeated use of the following elementary fact:

If M_{1} ⊇ M_{2} are two von Neumann algebras such that p_{n} M_{1} = p_{n} M_{2} for a family of projections p_{n} in the commutant of M_{1} increasing to I in the strong operator topology, then M_{1} = M_{2}.

== Hilbert algebras ==
The theory of Hilbert algebras was introduced by Godement (under the name "unitary algebras"), Segal and Dixmier to formalize the classical method of defining the trace for trace class operators starting from Hilbert–Schmidt operators. Applications in the representation theory of groups naturally lead to examples of Hilbert algebras. Every von Neumann algebra endowed with a semifinite trace has a canonical "completed" or "full" Hilbert algebra associated with it; and conversely a completed Hilbert algebra of exactly this form can be canonically associated with every Hilbert algebra. The theory of Hilbert algebras can be used to deduce the commutation theorems of Murray and von Neumann; equally well the main results on Hilbert algebras can also be deduced directly from the commutation theorems for traces. The theory of Hilbert algebras was generalised by Takesaki as a tool for proving commutation theorems for semifinite weights in Tomita–Takesaki theory; they can be dispensed with when dealing with states.

=== Definition ===
A Hilbert algebra is an algebra $\mathfrak{A}$ with involution x→x* and an inner product (,) such that

1. (a, b) = (b*, a*) for a, b in $\mathfrak{A}$;
2. left multiplication by a fixed a in $\mathfrak{A}$ is a bounded operator;
3. * is the adjoint, in other words (xy, z) = (y, x*z);
4. the linear span of all products xy is dense in $\mathfrak{A}$.

=== Examples ===
- The Hilbert–Schmidt operators on an infinite-dimensional Hilbert space form a Hilbert algebra with inner product (a, b) = Tr (b*a).
- If (X, μ) is an infinite measure space, the algebra L^{∞} (X) $\cap$ L^{2}(X) is a Hilbert algebra with the usual inner product from L^{2}(X).
- If M is a von Neumann algebra with faithful semifinite trace τ, then the *-subalgebra M_{0} defined above is a Hilbert algebra with inner product (a, b) = τ(b*a).
- If G is a unimodular locally compact group, the convolution algebra L^{1}(G)$\cap$L^{2}(G) is a Hilbert algebra with the usual inner product from L^{2}(G).
- If (G, K) is a Gelfand pair, the convolution algebra L^{1}(K\G/K)$\cap$L^{2}(K\G/K) is a Hilbert algebra with the usual inner product from L^{2}(G); here L^{p}(K\G/K) denotes the closed subspace of K-biinvariant functions in L^{p}(G).
- Any dense *-subalgebra of a Hilbert algebra is also a Hilbert algebra.

=== Properties ===
Let H be the Hilbert space completion of $\mathfrak{A}$ with respect to the inner product and let J denote the extension of the involution to a conjugate-linear involution of H. Define a representation λ and an anti-representation ρ of $\mathfrak{A}$ on itself by left and right multiplication:

$$\lambda(a)x = ax,\,\, \rho(a)x = xa.$$

These actions extend continuously to actions on H. In this case the commutation theorem for Hilbert algebras states that

$\lambda(\mathfrak{A})^{\prime\prime} = \rho(\mathfrak{A})^\prime$

Moreover if

$$M = \lambda(\mathfrak{A})^{\prime\prime},$$

the von Neumann algebra generated by the operators λ(a), then

$JMJ = M^\prime$

These results were proved independently by Godement (1954) and Segal (1953).

The proof relies on the notion of "bounded elements" in the Hilbert space completion H.

An element of x in H is said to be bounded (relative to $\mathfrak{A}$) if the map a → xa of $\mathfrak{A}$ into H extends to a bounded operator on H, denoted by λ(x). In this case it is straightforward to prove that:

- Jx is also a bounded element, denoted x*, and λ(x*) = λ(x)*;
- a → ax is given by the bounded operator ρ(x) = Jλ(x*)J on H;
- M ' is generated by the ρ(x)'s with x bounded;
- λ(x) and ρ(y) commute for x, y bounded.

The commutation theorem follows immediately from the last assertion. In particular $M = \lambda(\mathfrak{B})''.$

The space of all bounded elements $\mathfrak{B}$ forms a Hilbert algebra containing $\mathfrak{A}$ as a dense *-subalgebra. It is said to be completed or full because any element in H bounded relative to $\mathfrak{B}$ must actually already lie in $\mathfrak{B}$. The functional τ on M_{+} defined by $\tau(x) = (a,a)$ if x = λ(a)*λ(a) and ∞ otherwise, yields a faithful semifinite trace on M with $M_0 = \mathfrak{B}.$

Thus:

There is a one-one correspondence between von Neumann algebras on H with faithful semifinite trace and full Hilbert algebras with Hilbert space completion H.

== See also ==
- von Neumann algebra
- Affiliated operator
- Tomita–Takesaki theory
