= Hyperfinite type II factor =

Unique von Neumann algebra

In mathematics, there are up to isomorphism exactly two separably acting hyperfinite type II factors; one infinite and one finite. Murray and von Neumann proved that up to isomorphism there is a unique von Neumann algebra that is a factor of type II_{1} and also hyperfinite; it is called the hyperfinite type II_{1} factor. There are an uncountable number of other factors of type II_{1}. Connes proved that the infinite one is also unique.

== Constructions ==
- The von Neumann group algebra of a discrete group with the infinite conjugacy class property is a factor of type II_{1}, and if the group is amenable and countable the factor is hyperfinite. There are many groups with these properties, as any locally finite group is amenable. For example, the von Neumann group algebra of the infinite symmetric group of all permutations of a countable infinite set that fix all but a finite number of elements gives the hyperfinite type II_{1} factor.
- The hyperfinite type II_{1} factor also arises from the group-measure space construction for ergodic free measure-preserving actions of countable amenable groups on probability spaces.
- The infinite tensor product of a countable number of factors of type I_{n} with respect to their tracial states is the hyperfinite type II_{1} factor. When n=2, this is also sometimes called the Clifford algebra of an infinite separable Hilbert space.
- If p is any non-zero finite projection in a hyperfinite von Neumann algebra A of type II, then pAp is the hyperfinite type II_{1} factor. Equivalently the fundamental group of A is the group of positive real numbers. This can often be hard to see directly. It is, however, obvious when A is the infinite tensor product of factors of type I_{n}, where n runs over all integers greater than 1 infinitely many times: just take p equivalent to an infinite tensor product of projections p_{n} on which the tracial state is either $1$ or $1- 1/n$.

== Properties ==
The hyperfinite II_{1} factor R is the unique smallest infinite dimensional factor in the following sense: it is contained in any other infinite dimensional factor, and any infinite dimensional factor contained in R is isomorphic to R.

The outer automorphism group of R is an infinite simple group with countable many conjugacy classes, indexed by pairs consisting of a positive integer p and a complex pth root of 1.

The projections of the hyperfinite II_{1} factor form a continuous geometry.

== The infinite hyperfinite type II factor ==
While there are other factors of type II_{∞}, there is a unique hyperfinite one, up to isomorphism. It consists of those infinite square matrices with entries in the hyperfinite type II_{1} factor that define bounded operators.

== See also ==
- Subfactors
