= Central carrier =

In the context of von Neumann algebras, the central carrier of a projection E is the smallest central projection, in the von Neumann algebra, that dominates E. It is also called the central support or central cover.

== Definition ==
Let L(H) denote the bounded operators on a Hilbert space H, M ⊂ L(H) be a von Neumann algebra, and M' the commutant of M. The center of M is Z(M) = M' ∩ M = {T ∈ M | TM = MT for all M ∈ M}. The central carrier C(E) of a projection E in M is defined as follows:

C(E) = ∧ {F ∈ Z(M) | F is a projection and F ≥ E}.

The symbol ∧ denotes the lattice operation on the projections in Z(M): F_{1} ∧ F_{2} is the projection onto the closed subspace Ran(F_{1}) ∩ Ran(F_{2}).

The abelian algebra Z(M), being the intersection of two von Neumann algebras, is also a von Neumann algebra. Therefore, C(E) lies in Z(M).

If one thinks of M as a direct sum (or more accurately, a direct integral) of its factors, then the central projections are the projections that are direct sums (direct integrals) of identity operators of (measurable sets of) the factors. If E is confined to a single factor, then C(E) is the identity operator in that factor. Informally, one would expect C(E) to be the direct sum of identity operators I where I is in a factor and I · E ≠ 0.

== An explicit description ==
The projection C(E) can be described more explicitly. It can be shown that Ran C(E) is the closed subspace generated by MRan(E).

If N is a von Neumann algebra, and E a projection that does not necessarily belong to N and has range K = Ran(E). The smallest central projection in N that dominates E is precisely the projection onto the closed subspace [N' K] generated by N' K. In symbols, if

F' = ∧ {F ∈ N | F is a projection and F ≥ E}

then Ran(F' ) = [N' K]. That [N' K] ⊂ Ran(F' ) follows from the definition of commutant. On the other hand, [N' K] is invariant under every unitary U in N' . Therefore the projection onto [N' K] lies in (N')' = N. Minimality of F' then yields Ran(F' ) ⊂ [N' K].

Now if E is a projection in M, applying the above to the von Neumann algebra Z(M) gives

Ran C(E) = [ Z(M)' Ran(E) ] = [ (M' ∩ M)' Ran(E) ] = [MRan(E)].

== Related results ==
One can deduce some simple consequences from the above description. Suppose E and F are projections in a von Neumann algebra M.

Proposition ETF = 0 for all T in M if and only if C(E) and C(F) are orthogonal, i.e. C(E)C(F) = 0.

Proof:

ETF = 0 for all T in M.
⇔ [M Ran(F)] ⊂ Ker(E).
⇔ C(F) ≤ 1 - E, by the discussion in the preceding section, where 1 is the unit in M.
⇔ E ≤ 1 - C(F).
⇔ C(E) ≤ 1 - C(F), since 1 - C(F) is a central projection that dominates E.
This proves the claim.

In turn, the following is true:

Corollary Two projections E and F in a von Neumann algebra M contain two nonzero sub-projections that are Murray-von Neumann equivalent if C(E)C(F) ≠ 0.

Proof:

C(E)C(F) ≠ 0.
⇒ ETF ≠ 0 for some T in M.
⇒ ETF has polar decomposition UH for some partial isometry U and positive operator H in M.
⇒ Ran(U) = Ran(ETF) ⊂ Ran(E). Also, Ker(U) = Ran(H)^{⊥} = Ran(ETF)^{⊥} = Ker(ET*F) ⊃ Ker(F); therefore Ker(U))^{⊥} ⊂ Ran(F).
⇒ The two equivalent projections UU* and U*U satisfy UU* ≤ E and U*U ≤ F.

In particular, when M is a factor, then there exists a partial isometry U ∈ M such that UU* ≤ E and U*U ≤ F. Using this fact and a maximality argument, it can be deduced that the Murray-von Neumann partial order « on the family of projections in M becomes a total order if M is a factor.

Proposition (Comparability) If M is a factor, and E, F ∈ M are projections, then either E « F or F « E.

Proof:

Let ~ denote the Murray-von Neumann equivalence relation. Consider the family S whose typical element is a set { (E_{i}, F_{i}) } where the orthogonal sets {E_{i}} and {F_{i}} satisfy E_{i} ≤ E, F_{i} ≤ F, and E_{i} ~ F_{i}. The family S is partially ordered by inclusion and the above corollary shows it is non-empty. Zorn's lemma ensures the existence of a maximal element { (E_{j}, F_{j}) }. Maximality ensures that either E = Σ E_{j} or F = Σ F_{j}. The countable additivity of ~ means E_{j} ~ Σ F_{j}. Thus the proposition holds.

Without the assumption that M is a factor, we have:

Proposition (Generalized Comparability) If M is a von Neumann algebra, and E, F ∈ M are projections, then there exists a central projection P ∈ Z(M) such that either EP « FP and F(1 - P) « E(1 - P).

Proof:

Let S be the same as in the previous proposition and again consider a maximal element { (E_{j}, F_{j}) }. Let R and S denote the "remainders": R = E - Σ E_{j} and S = F - Σ F_{j}. By maximality and the corollary, RTS = 0 for all T in M. So C(R)C(S) = 0. In particular R · C(S) = 0 and S · C(S) = 0. So multiplication by C(S) removes the remainder R from E while leaving S in F. More precisely, E · C(S) = (Σ E_{j} + R) · C(S) = (Σ E_{j}) · C(S) ~ (Σ F_{j}) · C(S) ≤ (Σ F_{j} + S) · C(S) = F · C(S). This shows that C(S) is the central projection with the desired properties.
