= Veblen–Young theorem =

In mathematics, the Veblen–Young theorem, proved by Oswald Veblen and John Wesley Young (1908, 1910, 1917), states that a projective space of dimension at least 3 can be constructed as the projective space associated to a vector space over a division ring (or field, by Wedderburn's little theorem).

Non-Desarguesian planes give examples of 2-dimensional projective spaces that do not arise from vector spaces over division rings, showing that the restriction to dimension at least 3 is necessary.

Jacques Tits generalized the Veblen–Young theorem to Tits buildings, showing that those of rank at least 3 arise from algebraic groups.

John von Neumann (1998) generalized the Veblen–Young theorem to continuous geometry, showing that a complemented modular lattice of order at least 4 is isomorphic to the principal right ideals of a von Neumann regular ring.

== Statement ==
A projective space S can be defined abstractly as a set P (the set of points), together with a set L of subsets of P (the set of lines), satisfying these axioms:

- Each two distinct points p and q are in exactly one line.
- Veblen's axiom: If a, b, c, d are distinct points and the lines through ab and cd meet, then so do the lines through ac and bd.
- Any line has at least 3 points on it.

The Veblen–Young theorem states that if the dimension of a projective space is at least 3 (meaning that there are two non-intersecting lines) then the projective space is isomorphic with the projective space of lines in a vector space over some division ring K.
