= Tomita =

Tomita (Japanese: 富田 or 冨田; meaning "wealthy rice field") is a Japanese surname. Notable people with the surname include:

- Aijiro Tomita (富田 愛次郎; 1885–1954), Japanese politician
- Hiroyuki Tomita (冨田 洋之; born 1980), Japanese gymnast
- Isao Tomita (冨田 勲; 1932–2016), Japanese electronic music composer
- Kazuo Tomita (富田 一雄; born 1939), Japanese swimmer who participated in the 1960 Summer Olympics in Rome
- Keiichi Tomita (冨田 恵一, born 1962), Japanese musician
- Kishti Tomita (born 1963), Swedish voice coach and television personality
- Kohsuke Tomita (冨田 康祐; born 1988), Japanese former professional baseball player
- Kohei Tomita (冨田 康平; born 1996), Japanese footballer
- Kōichirō Tomita (冨田 弘一郎; 1925–2006), Japanese astronomer
- Kōsei Tomita (富田 耕生; 1936–2020), Japanese voice actor
- Makiko Tomita (冨田 真紀子; born 1991), Japanese rugby sevens player
- Masaru Tomita (冨田 勝; born 1957), Japanese molecular biologist and computer science professor, and son of Isao Tomita
- Masaru Tomita (baseball) (富田 勝; 1946 - 2015), Japanese former professional baseball player
- Mayu Tomita (冨田 真由; born 1995), Japanese singer and actress
- Minoru Tomita (冨田 稔; 1924–2015), Japanese mathematician and originator of Tomita-Takesaki theory in von Neumann algebras.
- Miyu Tomita (富田 美憂; born 1999), Japanese voice actress and singer
- Naoya Tomita (冨田 尚弥; born 1989), Japanese breaststroke swimmer
- Nene Tomita (冨田 寧寧; born 1982), Japanese volleyball player
- Ryuichiro Tomita (富田 竜一郎; born 1988), Japanese racing driver
- Sena Tomita (冨田 せな; born 1999), Japanese snowboarder
- Shoichi Tomita (富田 正一; born 1936), Japanese Olympic ice hockey player
- Suzuka Tomita (富田 鈴花; born 2001), Japanese idol
- Tamlyn Tomita (born 1966), Japanese-born American actress
- Teiko Tomita (1896–1990), Japanese poet
- Tomita Tsunejirō (富田 常次郎; 1865–1937), Japanese judoka, and the first ever to be awarded black belt in judo
- Tsutomu Tomita (冨田 務; born 1943), the former chairman of Toyota Motorsport GmbH and current president of Fuji Speedway
- Richard Tomita (1927–2021), American Olympic weightlifter
- Yann Tomita (ヤン 富田, born 1952), Japanese musician
- Yoshio Tomita (富田 芳雄), Japanese table tennis world champion

== See also ==
- Tomita–Takesaki theory
