= Not My Time (song) =

Single

Not My Time is a pop song by the Spectra 2015 Singers. 100% of net proceeds from the recording benefit the Rainbow Association of Canadian Artists (RACA) and the Cancer Society.

This song was co-written by RACA Executive Director Ralph Hamelmann, ZEDD Records producer Mark Zubek and Gemini Award-winner Paul Bellini. It was available for pre-orders on May 7, 2015 and released on June 22, 2015.

== Inspiration for “Not My Time" ==
In 2014, Hamelmann's mother (Sylvia Hynes) beat bowel cancer despite being given a 30% to 50% chance of surviving. According to Hamelmann, "I wanted to write a song that would inspire others in her situation."

== Reception ==
Peter Edwards of the Toronto Star described "Not My Time" as "a powerful anthem in the fight against cancer."

Q107 CILQ-FM described it as "(a) powerful anti-cancer music video."

100.5 Fresh Radio CKRU-FM described the music video as "inspirational."

== Chart performance ==
Within hours of its release, "Not My Time" reached #1 on the iTunes Canada Easy Listening Chart.

== Rob Ford Appearance ==
On the Radio Edit of "Not My Time", former Toronto Mayor Rob Ford sings the last line and makes a brief appearance in the music video.

Ford was diagnosed with pleomorphic liposarcoma cancer in 2014, and went in for surgery on May 11, 2015. In a statement, Ford asked "everyone to put their politics aside and stand behind the causes this song represents."

According to Hamelmann: “Given Rob Ford's current bout with the disease, his celebrity status, and his previous work with Canadian musicians, he was an obvious choice for this project."

== Music video ==
An official music video produced and directed by Hamelmann was released on www.notmytime.ca and YouTube on May 6, 2015.

It features the vocalists in various roles such as a boxer, cancer patient, and karate fighter. The singers also appear in footage shot during their recording sessions.

The video also features a topless breast cancer survivor holding a sign that reads: “Cancer took my breasts…Not my Life.”

== The “Not My Time Challenge” ==
On May 15, 2015 RACA launched the “Not My Time Challenge." Participants were asked to film themselves singing the chorus of "Not My Time" and post these videos to social media.

== Participating vocalists ==
The Spectra 2015 Singers are an ensemble of indie recording artists that participated in the 2015 season of Spectra Talent Contest. This includes following singers (in order of appearance): Rayelle, Vijay Mohan, Beatrice, Liron, Alexa Muir, Elad, Lauren Hoyles, Sammie Gamble, Julia Gartha, Jeff Matthew, and Amy Clara. Additional vocals were provided by Ralph Hamelmann and Rob Ford.

== Previous RACA recordings (by the Spectra Singers) ==
In 2014, Hamelmann, Zubek and Bellini penned "Without Words," a recording in support of the Ontario Society for the Prevention of Cruelty to Animals. Performed by the Spectra 2014 Singers, this song reached #1 on the iTunes Canada Easy Listening Chart.

In 2013, Hamelmann and Bellini worked with Juno Award-winning producer Gavin Bradley on "If You're Not Here At Christmas." This holiday song performed by the Spectra Singers was certified gold by Music Canada.
