= Noncommutative measure and integration =

Noncommutative measure and integration refers to the theory of weights, states, and traces on von Neumann algebras (Takesaki 1979 v. 2 p. 141).
