= Masamichi Takesaki =

Japanese mathematician

Masamichi Takesaki (竹崎 正道; born July 18, 1933, in Sendai) is a Japanese mathematician working in the theory of operator algebras.

Takesaki studied at Tohoku University, earning a bachelor's degree in 1956, a master's degree in 1958 and a doctorate in 1965. Beginning in 1958 he was a research assistant at the Tokyo Institute of Technology and from 1965 to 1968 he was an associate professor at Tohoku University. From 1968 to 1969 he was a visiting associate professor at the University of Pennsylvania. In 1970, he became a professor at the University of California, Los Angeles. He was also a visiting professor at Aix-Marseille University (1973–74) and Bielefeld University (1975–76).

He is known for the Tomita–Takesaki theory, which is about modular automorphisms of von Neumann algebras. This theory was initially developed by Minoru Tomita until 1967, but his work was published only partially (in Japanese) and was quite difficult to understand, drawing little notice, before being presented by Takesaki in 1970 in a book.

In 1970, he was an invited speaker at the International Congress of Mathematicians in Nice; his talk was about one parameter automorphism groups and states of operator algebras. In 1990 he was awarded the Fujiwara Science Prize. He is a fellow of the American Mathematical Society.

== Works ==
- Tomita's theory of modular Hilbert algebras and its applications, lecture notes mathematics, band 128, Springer Verlag 1970
- Theory of operator algebras, 3 volumes, encyclopedia of mathematical sciences, Springer-Verlag, 2001–2003 (the first volume was published 1979 in 1. Edition)

== See also ==
- Nuclear C*-algebra
