= Strongly regular =

In mathematics, strongly regular might refer to:

- Strongly regular graph
- Strongly regular ring, or "strongly von Neumann regular" ring
