= Finite von Neumann algebra =

In mathematics, a finite von Neumann algebra is a von Neumann algebra in which every isometry is a unitary. In other words, for an operator V in a finite von Neumann algebra if $V^*V = I$, then $VV^* = I$. In terms of the comparison theory of projections, the identity operator is not (Murray-von Neumann) equivalent to any proper subprojection in the von Neumann algebra.

== Properties ==
Let $\mathcal{M}$ denote a finite von Neumann algebra with center $\mathcal{Z}$. One of the fundamental characterizing properties of finite von Neumann algebras is the existence of a center-valued trace. A von Neumann algebra $\mathcal{M}$ is finite if and only if there exists a normal positive bounded map $\tau : \mathcal{M} \to \mathcal{Z}$ with the properties:

- $\tau(AB) = \tau(BA), A, B \in \mathcal{M}$,
- if $A \ge 0$ and $\tau(A) = 0$ then $A = 0$,
- $\tau(C) = C$ for $C \in \mathcal{Z}$,
- $\tau(CA) = C\tau(A)$ for $A \in \mathcal{M}$ and $C \in \mathcal{Z}$.

== Examples ==
=== Finite-dimensional von Neumann algebras ===
The finite-dimensional von Neumann algebras can be characterized using Wedderburn's theory of semisimple algebras. Let C^{n × n} be the n × n matrices with complex entries. A von Neumann algebra M is a self adjoint subalgebra in C^{n × n} such that M contains the identity operator I in C^{n × n}.

Every such M as defined above is a semisimple algebra, i.e. it contains no nilpotent ideals. Suppose M ≠ 0 lies in a nilpotent ideal of M. Since M* ∈ M by assumption, we have M*M, a positive semidefinite matrix, lies in that nilpotent ideal. This implies (M*M)^{k} = 0 for some k. So M*M = 0, i.e. M = 0.

The center of a von Neumann algebra M will be denoted by Z(M). Since M is self-adjoint, Z(M) is itself a (commutative) von Neumann algebra. A von Neumann algebra N is called a factor if Z(N) is one-dimensional, that is, Z(N) consists of multiples of the identity I.

Theorem Every finite-dimensional von Neumann algebra M is a direct sum of m factors, where m is the dimension of Z(M).

Proof: By Wedderburn's theory of semisimple algebras, Z(M) contains a finite orthogonal set of idempotents (projections) {P_{i}} such that P_{i}P_{j} = 0 for i ≠ j, Σ P_{i} = I, and

$$Z(\mathbf M) = \bigoplus _i  Z(\mathbf M) P_i$$

where each Z(M)P_{i} is a commutative simple algebra. Every complex simple algebras is isomorphic to the full matrix algebra C^{k × k} for some k. But Z(M)P_{i} is commutative, therefore one-dimensional.

The projections P_{i} "diagonalizes" M in a natural way. For M ∈ M, M can be uniquely decomposed into M = Σ MP_{i}. Therefore,

$${\mathbf M} = \bigoplus_i  {\mathbf M} P_i .$$

One can see that Z(MP_{i}) = Z(M)P_{i}. So Z(MP_{i}) is one-dimensional and each MP_{i} is a factor. This proves the claim.

For general von Neumann algebras, the direct sum is replaced by the direct integral. The above is a special case of the central decomposition of von Neumann algebras.

=== Abelian von Neumann algebras ===
Abelian von Neumann algebras are all isomorphic to a multiplication algebra $L^\infty(X)$ for some measure space $(X,\mu)$. Since an abelian von Neumann algebra M is commutative, for any $V\in M$, $V^*V=VV^*$, so clearly any isometry is unitary.
