= List of awards and honors received by John von Neumann =

John von Neumann (/vɒn ˈnɔɪmən/ von NOY-mən; Hungarian: Neumann János Lajos [ˈnɒjmɒn ˈjaːnoʃ ˈlɒjoʃ]; December 28, 1903 – February 8, 1957) was a Hungarian-American mathematician, physicist, computer scientist, engineer and polymath.

Von Neumann was twice invited speaker at the International Congress of Mathematicians. The May 1958 issue of the Bulletin of the American Mathematical Society was dedicated as a memorial volume (in an act without precedent) to von Neumann and eight articles were written about him and his work by friends and colleagues. The National Academy of Sciences published a biographical memoir by Salomon Bochner. In addition, obituaries were written in several other journals, including the Journal of the London Mathematical Society, Bulletin of the Atomic Scientists, Matematikai Lapok, Physics Today, Science, Mathematics of Computation and The Economic Journal. Books, scientific papers, and events have been dedicated to him.

In honor of his achievements and contributions to the modern world, he was named in 1999 the Financial Times Person of the Century, as a representative of the century's characteristic ideal that the power of the mind could shape the physical world, and of the "intellectual brilliance and human savagery" that defined the 20th century. On May 4, 2005, the United States Postal Service issued the American Scientists commemorative postage stamp series, a set of four 37-cent self-adhesive stamps in several configurations designed by artist Victor Stabin. The scientists depicted were von Neumann, Barbara McClintock, Josiah Willard Gibbs, and Richard Feynman.

Other awards and honors he received include the following.

Awards:

- 1926 Rockefeller Fellowship
- 1937 Bôcher Memorial Prize, American Mathematical Society
- 1947 Medal for Merit (Presidential Award)
- 1947 Distinguished Civilian Service Award, U.S. Navy
- 1955 Science Award, Air Force Association
- 1956 Medal of Freedom (Presidential Award)
- 1956 Albert Einstein Commemorative Award
- 1956 Enrico Fermi Award, U.S. Atomic Energy Commission
- 1957 American Meteorological Society Award for Extraordinary Scientific Accomplishment
- 1997 Air Force Space and Missile Pioneers Award (Posthumous)
- 1997 Hall of Fame, Space Command Headquarters, Peterson Air Force Base (Posthumous)

Honorary societies:

- Academia Nacional de Ciencias Exactas, Lima, Peru
- Academia Nazionale dei Lincei, Rome, Italy
- American Academy of Arts and Sciences
- American Philosophical Society
- Istituto Lombardo Accademia di Scienze e Lettere, Milan, Italy
- National Academy of Sciences
- Royal Netherlands Academy of Sciences and Letters, Amsterdam, Netherlands

Honorary doctorates:

- 1947 Princeton University
- 1949 University of Pennsylvania
- 1949 Harvard University
- 1952 University of Istanbul
- 1952 Case Institute of Technology
- 1952 University of Maryland
- 1953 Polytechnics Institut, Munich
- 1954 Columbia University

Honorary positions:

- 1937 American Mathematical Society Colloquium Lecturer
- 1944 Gibbs Lecturer, American Mathematical Society
- 1951-1953 President, American Mathematical Society
- 1953 Vanuxem Lecturer, Princeton University
- 1950-1957 Member, board of advisors, Universidad de Los Andes, Colombia

== See also ==
- List of things named after John von Neumann
