= Ralph Hamelmann =

Ralph Hamelmann (born July 21, 1967 in St. John's, Newfoundland) is a songwriter, professor, columnist, cartoonist and television producer.

Since moving to Toronto in 1987, Hamelmann's cartoons and written articles have appeared in several publications including: The Newfoundland Herald, Xtra!, Toronto Sun, Calgary Herald, Eye Weekly, 24 Hours and Monday Magazine. In 1994, a comic book anthology of Hamelmann's cartoon strip, 'For Warped Minds Only', was published by Odyssey Publications. He was Editor-In-Chief of Inq Magazine, a Toronto-based holistic health journal that was launched in 2000 (ISSN 1499-6588).

Hamelmann has produced television segments for 10% QTV (1997–98) and QT: QueerTelevision (1998). In 1998, he created and hosted Cutting Edge, a documentary-style television series that aired on Rogers TV. The show earned Hamelmann the 1999 Galaxi Award from the Ontario Cable Television Producers Society. In 2014, he was Executive Producer and Backstage Host of Spectra Talent Contest—an eight-part TV series that aired on OUTtv and Bell Local.

Since 2001, Hamelmann has been a professor at George Brown College. He was the recipient of the 2006 Award for Teaching Excellence.

Hamelmann is the founding president and executive director of the Rainbow Association of Canadian Artists, a Toronto-based non-profit organization that produces Spectra. In 2013, Hamelmann co-wrote "If You're Not Here At Christmas" with Juno Award winner Gavin Bradley and Gemini Award winner Paul Bellini. This song was certified gold by Music Canada. In 2014, Hamelmann co-wrote "Without Words" a song in support of the Ontario Society for the Prevention of Cruelty to Animals that reached No. 1 on the iTunes Canada Easy Listening Chart. In 2015, he co-wrote Not My Time—a song in support of the Canadian Cancer Society that also reached No. 1 on the iTunes Canada Easy Listening Chart.
