= Baer ring =

In abstract algebra and functional analysis, Baer rings, Baer *-rings, Rickart rings, Rickart *-rings, and AW*-algebras are various attempts to give an algebraic analogue of von Neumann algebras, using axioms about annihilators of various sets.

Any von Neumann algebra is a Baer *-ring, and much of the theory of projections in von Neumann algebras can be extended to all Baer *-rings, For example, Baer *-rings can be divided into types I, II, and III in the same way as von Neumann algebras.

In the literature, left Rickart rings have also been termed left PP-rings. ("Principal implies projective": See definitions below.)

== Definitions ==
- An idempotent element of a ring is an element e which has the property that e^{2} = e.
- The left annihilator of a set $X \subseteq R$ is $\{r\in R\mid rX=\{0\}\}$
- A (left) Rickart ring is a ring satisfying any of the following conditions:
1. the left annihilator of any single element of R is generated (as a left ideal) by an idempotent element.
2. (For unital rings) the left annihilator of any element is a direct summand of R.
3. All principal left ideals (ideals of the form Rx) are projective R modules.
- A Baer ring has the following definitions:
1. The left annihilator of any subset of R is generated (as a left ideal) by an idempotent element.
2. (For unital rings) The left annihilator of any subset of R is a direct summand of R. For unital rings, replacing all occurrences of 'left' with 'right' yields an equivalent definition, that is to say, the definition is left-right symmetric.

In operator theory, the definitions are strengthened slightly by requiring the ring R to have an involution $*:R\rightarrow R$. Since this makes R isomorphic to its opposite ring R^{op}, the definition of Rickart *-ring is left-right symmetric.

- A projection in a *-ring is an idempotent p that is self-adjoint (p* = p).
- A Rickart *-ring is a *-ring such that left annihilator of any element is generated (as a left ideal) by a projection.
- A Baer *-ring is a *-ring such that left annihilator of any subset is generated (as a left ideal) by a projection.
- An AW*-algebra, introduced by Kaplansky (1951), is a C*-algebra that is also a Baer *-ring.

== Examples ==
- Since the principal left ideals of a left hereditary ring or left semihereditary ring are projective, it is clear that both types are left Rickart rings. This includes von Neumann regular rings, which are left and right semihereditary. If a von Neumann regular ring R is also right or left self injective, then R is Baer.
- Any semisimple ring is Baer, since all left and right ideals are summands in R, including the annihilators.
- Any domain is Baer, since all annihilators are $\{0\}$ except for the annihilator of 0, which is R, and both $\{0\}$ and R are summands of R.
- The ring of bounded linear operators on a Hilbert space are a Baer ring and is also a Baer *-ring with the involution * given by the adjoint.
- von Neumann algebras are examples of all the different sorts of ring above.

== Properties ==
The projections in a Rickart *-ring form a lattice, which is complete if the ring is a Baer *-ring.

== See also ==
- Baer *-semigroup
