= AW*-algebra =

In mathematics, an AW*-algebra is an algebraic generalization of a W*-algebra. They were introduced by Irving Kaplansky in 1951. As operator algebras, von Neumann algebras, among all C*-algebras, are typically handled using one of two means: they are the dual space of some Banach space, and they are determined to a large extent by their projections. The idea behind AW*-algebras is to forget the former, topological, condition, and use only the latter, algebraic, condition.

== Definition ==
Recall that a projection of a C*-algebra is a self-adjoint idempotent element. A C*-algebra A is an AW*-algebra if for every subset S of A, the left annihilator

$$\mathrm{Ann}_L(S)=\{a\in A\mid \forall s\in S, as=0 \}\,$$

is generated as a left ideal by some projection p of A, and similarly the right annihilator is generated as a right ideal by some projection q:

$$\forall S \subseteq A\, \exists p,q \in \mathrm{Proj}(A) \colon \mathrm{Ann}_L(S)=Ap, \quad \mathrm{Ann}_R(S)=qA$$.

Hence an AW*-algebra is a C*-algebra that is at the same time a Baer *-ring.

The original definition of Kaplansky states that an AW*-algebra is a C*-algebra such that (1) any set of orthogonal projections has a least upper bound, and (2) each maximal commutative C*-subalgebra is generated by its projections. The first condition states that the projections have an interesting structure, while the second condition ensures that there are enough projections for it to be interesting. Note that the second condition is equivalent to the condition that each maximal commutative C*-subalgebra is monotone complete.

== Structure theory ==
Many results concerning von Neumann algebras carry over to AW*-algebras. For example, AW*-algebras can be classified according to the behavior of their projections, and decompose into types. For another example, normal matrices with entries in an AW*-algebra can always be diagonalized. AW*-algebras also always have polar decomposition.

However, there are also ways in which AW*-algebras behave differently from von Neumann algebras. For example, AW*-algebras of type I can exhibit pathological properties, even though Kaplansky already showed that such algebras with trivial center are automatically von Neumann algebras.

== The commutative case ==
A commutative C*-algebra is an AW*-algebra if and only if its spectrum is a Stonean space. Via Stone duality, commutative AW*-algebras therefore correspond to complete Boolean algebras. The projections of a commutative AW*-algebra form a complete Boolean algebra, and conversely, any complete Boolean algebra is isomorphic to the projections of some commutative AW*-algebra.
