= Crossed product =

In mathematics, a crossed product is a basic method of constructing a new von Neumann algebra from a von Neumann algebra acted on by a group. It is related to the semidirect product construction for groups. (Roughly speaking, crossed product is the expected structure for a group ring of a semidirect product group. Therefore crossed products have a ring theory aspect also. This article concentrates on an important case, where they appear in functional analysis.)

== Motivation ==
Recall that if we have two finite groups G and N with an action of G on N we can form the semidirect product $N \rtimes G$. This contains N as a normal subgroup, and the action of G on N is given by conjugation in the semidirect product. We can replace N by its complex group algebra C[N], and again form a product $C[N] \rtimes G$ in a similar way; this algebra is a sum of subspaces gC[N] as g runs through the elements of G, and is the group algebra of $N \rtimes G$. We can generalize this construction further by replacing C[N] by any algebra A acted on by G to get a crossed product $A \rtimes G$, which is the sum of subspaces gA and where the action of G on A is given by conjugation in the crossed product.

The crossed product of a von Neumann algebra by a group G acting on it is similar except that we have to be more careful about topologies, and need to construct a Hilbert space acted on by the crossed product. (Note that the von Neumann algebra crossed product is usually larger than the algebraic crossed product discussed above; in fact it is some sort of completion of the algebraic crossed product.)

In physics, this structure appears in presence of the so called gauge group of the first kind. G is the gauge group, and N the "field" algebra. The observables are then defined as the fixed points of N under the action of G. A result by Doplicher, Haag and Roberts says that under some assumptions the crossed product can be recovered from the algebra of observables.

== Construction ==
Suppose that A is a von Neumann algebra of operators acting on a Hilbert space H and G is a discrete group acting on A. We let K be the Hilbert space of all square summable H-valued functions on G. There is an action of A on K given by

a(k)(g) = g^{−1}(a)k(g)

for k in K, g, h in G, and a in A, and there is an action of G on K given by

g(k)(h) = k(g^{−1}h).

The crossed product $A \rtimes G$ is the von Neumann algebra acting on K generated by the actions of A and G on K. It does not depend (up to isomorphism) on the choice of the Hilbert space H.

This construction can be extended to work for any locally compact group G acting on any von Neumann algebra A. When A is an abelian von Neumann algebra, this is the original group-measure space construction of Murray and von Neumann.

== Properties ==
We let G be an infinite countable discrete group acting on the abelian von Neumann algebra A. The action is called free if A has no non-zero projections p such that some nontrivial g fixes all elements of pAp. The action is called ergodic if the only invariant projections are 0 and 1. Usually A can be identified as the abelian von Neumann algebra $L^\infty(X)$ of essentially bounded functions on a measure space X acted on by G, and then the action of G on X is ergodic (for any measurable invariant subset, either the subset or its complement has measure 0) if and only if the action of G on A is ergodic.

If the action of G on A is free and ergodic then the crossed product $A \rtimes G$ is a factor. Moreover:

- The factor is of type I if A has a minimal projection such that 1 is the sum of the G conjugates of this projection. This corresponds to the action of G on X being transitive. Example: X is the integers, and G is the group of integers acting by translations.
- The factor has type II_{1} if A has a faithful finite normal G-invariant trace. This corresponds to X having a finite G invariant measure, absolutely continuous with respect to the measure on X. Example: X is the unit circle in the complex plane, and G is the group of all roots of unity.
- The factor has type II_{∞} if it is not of types I or II_{1} and has a faithful semifinite normal G-invariant trace. This corresponds to X having an infinite G invariant measure without atoms, absolutely continuous with respect to the measure on X. Example: X is the real line, and G is the group of rationals acting by translations.
- The factor has type III if A has no faithful semifinite normal G-invariant trace. This corresponds to X having no non-zero absolutely continuous G-invariant measure. Example: X is the real line, and G is the group of all transformations ax+b for a and b rational, a non-zero.

In particular one can construct examples of all the different types of factors as crossed products.

== Duality ==
If $A$ is a von Neumann algebra on which a locally compact Abelian $G$ acts, then $\Gamma$, the dual group of characters $\chi$ of $G$, acts by unitaries on $K$ :

- $(\chi\cdot k)(h) =\chi(h) k(h)$

These unitaries normalise the crossed product, defining the dual action of $\Gamma$. Together with the crossed product, they generate $A\otimes B(L^2(G))$, which can be identified with the iterated crossed product by the dual action $(A\rtimes G) \rtimes \Gamma$ . Under this identification, the double dual action of $G$ (the dual group of $\Gamma$) corresponds to the tensor product of the original action on $A$ and conjugation by the following unitaries on $L^2(G)$ :

- $(g\cdot f)(h)=f(hg)$

The crossed product may be identified with the fixed point algebra of the double dual action. More generally $A$ is the fixed point algebra of $\Gamma$ in the crossed product.

Similar statements hold when $G$ is replaced by a non-Abelian locally compact group or more generally a locally compact quantum group, a class of Hopf algebra related to von Neumann algebras. An analogous theory has also been developed for actions on C* algebras and their crossed products.

Duality first appeared for actions of the reals in the work of Connes and Takesaki on the classification of Type III factors. According to Tomita–Takesaki theory, every vector which is cyclic for the factor and its commutant gives rise to a 1-parameter modular automorphism group. The corresponding crossed product is a Type $II_\infty$ von Neumann algebra and the corresponding dual action restricts to an ergodic action of the reals on its centre, an Abelian von Neumann algebra. This ergodic flow is called the flow of weights; it is independent of the choice of cyclic vector. The Connes spectrum, a closed subgroup of the positive reals $\mathbb{R}^{+}$, is obtained by applying the exponential to the kernel of this flow.

- When the kernel is the whole of $R$, the factor is type $III_1$.
- When the kernel is $(\log \lambda) Z$ for $\lambda$ in (0,1), the factor is type $III_\lambda$.
- When the kernel is trivial, the factor is type $III_0$.

Connes and Haagerup proved that the Connes spectrum and the flow of weights are complete invariants of hyperfinite Type III factors. From this classification and results in ergodic theory, it is known that every infinite-dimensional hyperfinite factor has the form $L^\infty(X)\rtimes Z$ for some free ergodic action of $Z$.

== Examples ==
- If we take $C$ to be the complex numbers, then the crossed product $C \rtimes G$ is called the von Neumann group algebra of G.
- If $G$ is an infinite discrete group such that every conjugacy class has infinite order then the von Neumann group algebra is a factor of type II_{1}. Moreover if every finite set of elements of $G$ generates a finite subgroup (or more generally if G is amenable) then the factor is the hyperfinite factor of type II_{1}.
