= Minoru Tomita =

Japanese mathematician

- Born: February 6, 1924
- Died: October 9, 2015 (aged 91)
- Education: Kyushu University; Osaka University (Ph.D.)
- Known for: Tomita-Takesaki theory
- Scientific career
- Fields: Mathematics
- Workplaces: Okayama University (1954-65); Kyushu University (1966-); Fukuoka University (1985-)

Minoru Tomita (冨田 稔, Tomita Minoru; February 6, 1924 – October 9, 2015) was a Japanese mathematician who made significant contributions to the theory of operator algebras.

He became deaf at the age of two. He was described as a "very singular" personality.

Although he published relatively little, his 1967 manuscript on the theory of modular automorphisms of von Neumann algebras was of major importance in the field. The manuscript was difficult to understand, but Masamichi Takesaki was able to revise it. In the summer of 1967 Takesaki communicated the results to Jacques Dixmier, and they became a major influence on the work of his student Alain Connes on the classification of type III factors. The theory later became known as Tomita-Takesaki theory.
