= Rank ring =

In mathematics, a rank ring is a ring with a real-valued rank function behaving like the rank of an endomorphism. John von Neumann (1998) introduced rank rings in his work on continuous geometry, and showed that the ring associated to a continuous geometry is a rank ring.

== Definition ==
John von Neumann (1998, p.231) defined a ring to be a rank ring if it is regular and has a real-valued rank function R with the following properties:

- 0 ≤ R(a) ≤ 1 for all a
- R(a) = 0 if and only if a = 0
- R(1) = 1
- R(ab) ≤ R(a), R(ab) ≤ R(b)
- If e^{2} = e, f^{2} = f, ef = fe = 0 then R(e + f ) = R(e) + R(f ).
