= John Wesley Young =

American mathematician (1879–1932)

- Education: Cornell University (1903)
- Spouse: Mary Louise Aston (m. 1907)
- Children: Mary Elizabeth (Young) Allyn
- Parents: William Henry Young (father); Marie Louise Widenhorn Young (mother)
- Scientific career
- Workplaces: Northwestern University; Princeton University; University of Illinois Urbana-Champaign; University of Kansas; University of Chicago; Dartmouth College

John Wesley Young (17 November 1879, Columbus, Ohio – 17 February 1932, Hanover, New Hampshire) was an American mathematician who, with Oswald Veblen, introduced the axioms of projective geometry, coauthored a two-volume work on them, and proved the Veblen–Young theorem. He was a proponent of Euclidean geometry and held it to be substantially "more convenient to employ" than non-Euclidean geometry. His lectures on algebra and geometry were compiled in 1911 and released as Lectures on Fundamental Concepts of Algebra and Geometry.

John Wesley Young was born in 1879 to William Henry Young and Marie Louise Widenhorn Young. William Henry Young was from West Virginia and was of Native American parentage. After serving in the Civil War he was appointed to the consulate in Germany. He taught Mathematics at Ohio University. Marie Louise Widehorn Young was born in Paris, France and spoke French and German fluently.

John Wesley grew up in both Europe and America due to his father's profession and attended schools in Baden Baden and Karlsruhe, Germany and Columbus, Ohio. Young was awarded a Master's degree in Mathematics from Cornell University in 1903.

John Wesley Young was married to Mary Louise Aston on July 20, 1907. They had one daughter, Mary Elizabeth, later Mrs. Allyn.

Between 1903 and 1911, Young held positions at Northwestern University, Princeton University, the University of Illinois, the University of Kansas, and the University of Chicago. He was head of the department of Mathematics at Dartmouth College from 1911 to 1919 and chair of the department from 1923 to 1925. He continued teaching until two days before he died.

== Publications ==
- Projective geometry with Oswald Veblen, Ginn and co., 1910–1918
- Lectures on Fundamental Concepts of Algebra and Geometry 1911
- Projective Geometry. Vol. 4 of Carus Mathematical Monographs. Chicago: Open Court. 1930.
