= Infinite conjugacy class property =

In mathematics, a group is said to have the infinite conjugacy class property, or to be an ICC group, if the conjugacy class of every group element but the identity is infinite.

The von Neumann group algebra of a group is a factor if and only if the group has the infinite conjugacy class property. It will then be, provided the group is nontrivial, of type II_{1}, i.e. it will possess a unique, faithful, tracial state.

Examples of ICC groups are the group of permutations of an infinite set that leave all but a finite subset of elements fixed, and free groups on two generators.

In abelian groups, every conjugacy class consists of only one element, so ICC groups are, in a way, as far from being abelian as possible.
