= Marot ring =

In mathematics, a Marot ring (English: /mɑːˈroʊ/ mah-ROH, French: [maʁo]), introduced by Marot (1969), is a commutative ring whose regular ideals are generated by regular elements.
