= Direct integral =

Generalization of the concept of a direct sum in mathematics

In mathematics and functional analysis, a direct integral or Hilbert integral is a generalization of the concept of a direct sum. The theory is most developed for direct integrals of Hilbert spaces and direct integrals of von Neumann algebras. The concept was introduced in 1949 by John von Neumann in one of the papers in the series On Rings of Operators. One of von Neumann's goals in this paper was to reduce the classification of (what are now called) von Neumann algebras on separable Hilbert spaces to the classification of so-called factors. Factors are analogous to full matrix algebras over a field, and von Neumann wanted to prove a continuous analogue of the Artin–Wedderburn theorem classifying semi-simple rings.

Results on direct integrals can be viewed as generalizations of results about finite-dimensional C*-algebras of matrices; in this case the results are easy to prove directly. The infinite-dimensional case is complicated by measure-theoretic technicalities.

Direct integral theory was also used by George Mackey in his analysis of systems of imprimitivity and his general theory of induced representations of locally compact separable groups.

== Direct integrals of Hilbert spaces ==
The simplest example of a direct integral is given by the L^{2} spaces associated to a (σ-finite) countably additive measure μ on a measurable space X. Somewhat more generally, one can consider a separable Hilbert space H and the space of square-integrable H-valued functions

$$L^2_\mu(X, H).$$

Terminological note: The terminology adopted by the literature on the subject is followed here, according to which a measurable space X is referred to as a Borel space and the elements of the distinguished σ-algebra of X as Borel sets, regardless of whether or not the underlying σ-algebra comes from a topological space (in most examples, it does). A Borel space is standard if and only if it is isomorphic to the underlying Borel space of a Polish space. All Polish spaces of a given cardinality are isomorphic to each other (as Borel spaces). Given a countably additive measure μ on X, a measurable set is one that differs from a Borel set by a null set. The measure μ on X is a standard measure if and only if there is a null set E such that its complement X − E is a standard Borel space. All measures considered here are σ-finite.

Definition. Let X be a Borel space equipped with a countably additive measure μ. A measurable family of Hilbert spaces on (X, μ) is a family {H_{x}: x∈X} that is locally equivalent to a trivial family in the following sense: There is a countable partition

$$\{X_n: 1 \leq n \leq \omega\}$$

of X by measurable subsets $X_n$ such that

$$H_x = \mathbf{H}_n, \quad  \forall x \in X_n,$$

where H_{n} is the canonical n-dimensional Hilbert space—that is,

$$\mathbf{H}_n = \begin{cases} \mathbb{C}^n & \text{if } n < \omega, \\ \ell^2 & \text{if } n = \omega. \end{cases}$$

In the above, $\ell^2$ is the space of square summable sequences. All infinite-dimensional separable Hilbert spaces are isomorphic to $\ell^2.$

A cross-section of {H_{x}}_{x∈ X} is a family {s_{x}}_{x ∈ X} such that s_{x} ∈ H_{x} for all x ∈ X. A cross-section is measurable if and only if its restriction to each partition element X_{n} is measurable. We will identify measurable cross-sections that are equal almost everywhere. Given a measurable family of Hilbert spaces, the direct integral

$$\int^\oplus_X H_x \, \mathrm{d} \mu(x)$$

consists of equivalence classes (with respect to almost everywhere equality) of measurable square-integrable cross-sections of {H_{x}}_{x∈ X}. This is a Hilbert space under the inner product

$$\langle s | t \rangle = \int_X \langle s(x) | t(x) \rangle  \, \mathrm{d} \mu(x).$$

Given the local nature of our definition, many definitions applicable to single Hilbert spaces apply to measurable families of Hilbert spaces as well.

Remark. This definition is apparently more restrictive than the one given by von Neumann and is discussed in Dixmier's classic treatise on von Neumann algebras. In the more general definition, the Hilbert space fibers H_{x} are allowed to vary from point to point without having a local triviality requirement (local in a measure-theoretic sense). One of the main theorems of the von Neumann theory is that the more general definition is equivalent to the simpler one given here.

Note that the direct integral of a measurable family of Hilbert spaces depends only on the measure class of the measure μ; more precisely:

Theorem. Suppose μ and ν are σ-finite countably additive measures on X that have the same sets of measure 0. Then the mapping

$$s \mapsto \left(\frac{\mathrm{d} \mu}{\mathrm{d} \nu}\right)^{1/2} s$$

is a unitary operator

$$\int^\oplus_X H_x \, \mathrm{d} \mu(x) \rightarrow \int^\oplus_X H_x \, \mathrm{d} \nu(x).$$

=== Example ===
The simplest example occurs when X is a countable set and μ is a discrete measure. Thus, when X = N and μ is the counting measure on N, any sequence {H_{n}}_{n∈ N} of separable Hilbert spaces can be considered as a measurable family. Moreover,

$$\int^\oplus_X H_x \, \mathrm{d} \mu(x) \cong \bigoplus_{n \in \mathbb{N}} H_n$$

== Decomposable operators ==
For the example of a discrete measure on a countable set, any bounded linear operator T on

$$H = \bigoplus_{k \in \mathbb{N}} H_k$$

is given by an infinite matrix

$$\begin{bmatrix} T_{1 1} & T_{1 2} & \cdots & T_{1 n} & \cdots \\ T_{2 1} & T_{2 2} & \cdots & T_{2 n} & \cdots \\
\vdots & \vdots & \ddots & \vdots & \cdots \\
T_{n 1} & T_{n 2} & \cdots & T_{n n} & \cdots \\
\vdots & \vdots & \cdots & \vdots & \ddots
\end{bmatrix}.$$

For this example, of a discrete measure on a countable set, decomposable operators are defined as the operators that are block diagonal, having zero for all non-diagonal entries. Decomposable operators can be characterized as those which commute with diagonal matrices:

$$\begin{bmatrix} \lambda_{1} & 0 & \cdots & 0 & \cdots \\ 0 & \lambda_{2} & \cdots & 0 & \cdots \\
\vdots & \vdots & \ddots & \vdots & \cdots \\
0 & 0 & \cdots & \lambda_{n} & \cdots \\
\vdots & \vdots & \cdots & \vdots & \ddots
\end{bmatrix}.$$

The above example motivates the general definition: A family of bounded operators {T_{x}}_{x∈ X} with T_{x} ∈ L(H_{x}) is said to be strongly measurable if and only if its restriction to each X_{n} is strongly measurable. This makes sense because H_{x} is constant on X_{n}.

Measurable families of operators with an essentially bounded norm, that is

$$\operatorname{ess-sup}_{x \in X} \|T_x\| < \infty$$

define bounded linear operators

$$\int^\oplus_X \ T_x d \mu(x)  \in \operatorname{L}\bigg(\int^\oplus_X H_x \ d \mu(x)\bigg)$$

acting in a pointwise fashion, that is

$$\bigg[\int^\oplus_X \ T_x d \mu(x) \bigg] \bigg(\int^\oplus_X \ s_x d \mu(x) \bigg) =  \int^\oplus_X \ T_x(s_x) d \mu(x).$$

Such operators are said to be decomposable.

Examples of decomposable operators are those defined by scalar-valued (i.e. C-valued) measurable functions λ on X. In fact,

Theorem. The mapping

$$\phi: L^\infty_\mu(X) \rightarrow \operatorname{L}\bigg(\int^\oplus_X H_x \ d \mu(x)\bigg)$$

given by

$$\lambda \mapsto \int^\oplus_X \ \lambda_x d \mu(x)$$

is an involutive algebraic isomorphism onto its image.

This allows L^{∞}_{μ}(X) to be identified with the image of φ.

Theorem Decomposable operators are precisely those that are in the operator commutant of the abelian algebra L^{∞}_{μ}(X).

=== Decomposition of Abelian von Neumann algebras ===
The spectral theorem has many variants. A particularly powerful version is as follows:

Theorem. For any Abelian von Neumann algebra A on a separable Hilbert space H, there is a standard Borel space X and a measure μ on X such that it is unitarily equivalent as an operator algebra to L^{∞}_{μ}(X) acting on a direct integral of Hilbert spaces

$$\int_X^\oplus H_x d \mu(x). \quad$$

To assert A is unitarily equivalent to L^{∞}_{μ}(X) as an operator algebra means that there is a unitary

$$U: H \rightarrow \int_X^\oplus H_x d\mu(x)$$

such that U A U* is the algebra of diagonal operators L^{∞}_{μ}(X). Note that this asserts more than just the algebraic equivalence of A with the algebra of diagonal operators.

This version of the spectral theorem does not explicitly state how the underlying standard Borel space X is obtained. There is a uniqueness result for the above decomposition.

Theorem. If the Abelian von Neumann algebra A is unitarily equivalent to both L^{∞}_{μ}(X) and L^{∞}_{ν}(Y) acting on the direct integral spaces

$$\int_X^\oplus H_x d \mu(x), \quad  \int_Y^\oplus K_y d \nu(y)$$

and μ, ν are standard measures, then there is a Borel isomorphism

$$\varphi: X - E \rightarrow Y - F$$

where E, F are null sets such that

$$K_{\phi(x)} = H_x \quad \mbox{almost everywhere}$$

The isomorphism φ is a measure class isomorphism, in that φ and its inverse preserve sets of measure 0.

The previous two theorems provide a complete classification of Abelian von Neumann algebras on separable Hilbert spaces. This classification takes into account the realization of the von Neumann algebra as an algebra of operators. If one considers the underlying von Neumann algebra independently of its realization (as a von Neumann algebra), then its structure is determined by very simple measure-theoretic invariants.

== Direct integrals of von Neumann algebras ==
Let {H_{x}}_{x ∈ X} be a measurable family of Hilbert spaces. A family of von Neumann algebras {A_{x}}_{x ∈ X} with

$$A_x \subseteq \operatorname{L}(H_x)$$

is measurable if and only if there is a countable set D of measurable operator families that pointwise generate {A_{x}} _{x ∈ X} as a von Neumann algebra in the following sense: For almost all x ∈ X,

$$\operatorname{W^*}(\{S_x: S \in D\}) = A_x$$

where W*(S) denotes the von Neumann algebra generated by the set S. If {A_{x}}_{x ∈ X} is a measurable family of von Neumann algebras, the direct integral of von Neumann algebras

$$\int_X^\oplus A_x d\mu(x)$$

consists of all operators of the form

$$\int_X^\oplus T_x d\mu(x)$$

for T_{x} ∈ A_{x}.

One of the main theorems of von Neumann and Murray in their original series of papers is a proof of the decomposition theorem: Any von Neumann algebra is a direct integral of factors. Precisely stated,

Theorem. If {A_{x}}_{x ∈ X} is a measurable family of von Neumann algebras and μ is standard, then the family of operator commutants is also measurable and

$$\bigg[\int_X^\oplus A_x d\mu(x)\bigg]' = \int_X^\oplus A'_x d\mu(x).$$

== Central decomposition ==
Suppose A is a von Neumann algebra. Let Z(A) be the center of A. The center is the set of operators in A that commute with all operators A:

$$\mathbf{Z}(A) = A \cap A'$$

Then Z(A) is an Abelian von Neumann algebra.

Example. The center of L(H) is 1-dimensional. In general, if A is a von Neumann algebra, if the center is 1-dimensional we say A is a factor.

When A is a von Neumann algebra whose center contains a sequence of minimal pairwise orthogonal non-zero projections {E_{i}}_{i ∈ N} such that

$$1 = \sum_{i \in \mathbb{N}} E_i$$

then A E_{i} is a von Neumann algebra on the range H_{i} of E_{i}. It is easy to see A E_{i} is a factor. Thus, in this special case

$$A = \bigoplus_{i \in \mathbb{N}} A E_i$$

represents A as a direct sum of factors. This is a special case of the central decomposition theorem of von Neumann.

In general, the structure theorem of Abelian von Neumann algebras represents Z(A) as an algebra of scalar diagonal operators. In any such representation, all the operators in A are decomposable operators. This can be used to prove the basic result of von Neumann: any von Neumann algebra admits a decomposition into factors.

Theorem. Suppose

$$H = \int_X^\oplus H_x d \mu(x)$$

is a direct integral decomposition of H and A is a von Neumann algebra on H so that Z(A) is represented by the algebra of scalar diagonal operators L^{∞}_{μ}(X) where X is a standard Borel space. Then

$$\mathbf{A} = \int^\oplus_X A_x d \mu(x)$$

where for almost all x ∈ X, A_{x} is a von Neumann algebra that is a factor.

== Measurable families of representations ==
If A is a separable C*-algebra, the above results can be applied to measurable families of non-degenerate *-representations of A. In the case that A has a unit, non-degeneracy is equivalent to unit-preserving. By the general correspondence that exists between strongly continuous unitary representations of a locally compact group G and non-degenerate *-representations of the groups C*-algebra C*(G), the theory for C*-algebras immediately provides a decomposition theory for representations of separable locally compact groups.

Theorem. Let A be a separable C*-algebra and π a non-degenerate involutive representation of A on a separable Hilbert space H. Let W*(π) be the von Neumann algebra generated by the operators π(a) for a ∈ A. Then corresponding to any central decomposition of W*(π) over a standard measure space (X, μ) (which, as stated, is unique in a measure theoretic sense), there is a measurable family of factor representations

$$\{\pi_x\}_{x \in X}$$

of A such that

$$\pi(a) = \int_X^\oplus \pi_x(a) d \mu(x), \quad \forall a \in A.$$

Moreover, there is a subset N of X with μ measure zero, such that π_{x}, π_{y} are disjoint whenever x, y ∈ X − N, where representations are said to be disjoint if and only if there are no intertwining operators between them.

One can show that the direct integral can be indexed on the so-called quasi-spectrum Q of A, consisting of quasi-equivalence classes of factor representations of A. Thus, there is a standard measure μ on Q and a measurable family of factor representations indexed on Q such that π_{x} belongs to the class of x. This decomposition is essentially unique. This result is fundamental in the theory of group representations.
