= Jankov–von Neumann uniformization theorem =

In descriptive set theory the Jankov–von Neumann uniformization theorem is a result saying that every measurable relation on a pair of standard Borel spaces (with respect to the sigma algebra of analytic sets) admits a measurable section. It is named after V. A. Jankov and John von Neumann. While the axiom of choice guarantees that every relation has a section, this is a stronger conclusion in that it asserts that the section is measurable, and thus "definable" in some sense without using the axiom of choice.

== Statement ==
Let $X,Y$ be standard Borel spaces and $R\subset X\times Y$ a subset that is measurable with respect to the analytic sets. Then there exists a measurable function $f:X\to Y$ such that, for all $x\in X$, $\exists y, R(x,y)$ if and only if $R(x,f(x))$.

An application of the theorem is that, given any measurable function $g:Y\to X$, there exists a universally measurable function $f:g(Y)\subset X\to Y$ such that $g(f(x))=x$ for all $x\in g(Y)$.
