= Gavin Bradley =

- Origin: Ottawa, Ontario, Canada
- Genres: Pop, R&B, Bossa nova, House Music
- Occupations: Singer-songwriter, record producer
- Instruments: Vocals, keyboards
- Years active: 1992–present

Gavin Bradley is a Canadian singer-songwriter and producer based in Toronto who has worked with artists like Nelly Furtado, Tori Amos and Jane Siberry. Fusing acoustic and electronic elements, his work is identifiable for its signature "warm" piano sound and live strings mixed with filtered synthesizers and other electronic manipulations ^{1}. Besides production, Bradley is a solo recording artist. His debut album 'Deep Freeze' was released on UMI Records in 2006.

== Early years ==
Growing up in Ottawa, Bradley began studying classical piano at four. At age 10, he obtained a pre-1900 Nordheimer upright piano. Bradley eventually used a sampler to record each key of this oddly detuned piano at many different volumes, recreating a digital version of it to be used as an organic centerpiece in his recordings and later on in his live shows. Also studying jazz saxophone from 14, saxophonists Stuart Matthewman of Sade, Branford Marsalis and John Coltrane were early influences.

In his early teens Bradley developed a strong interest in creating and manipulating music electronically using synthesizers, turntables, tape splicing and effects units. Some electronic influences Bradley cites are experimental Toronto band Syrinx led by Anne Murray keyboardist John Mills-Cockell, early Pink Floyd, Tomita, Giorgio Moroder, Eurythmics, Yaz, Thomas Dolby, Pet Shop Boys, Depeche Mode, New Order, William Orbit and Björk.

== Early studio work ==
In 1991, Bradley relocated to Toronto to study film and music at York University and began a residency at Toronto club Work. In 1992 he began an apprenticeship in Toronto recording studio Number Nine Sound and later was an assistant engineer at R&B production house TazzDab Productions. His early production work included remixes for R&B singer Carlos Morgan, Canadian independent artist Jane Siberry and as well as Sony Music artist Esthero.

== Collaborations ==
Through Esthero's manager, Canadian Idol judge Zack Werner, Bradley met and began collaborating with Jon Levine, songwriter and keyboard player for The Philosopher Kings. Together they worked with EMI artist Dayna Manning and received a Best R&B Recording Juno Award for JackSoul's 'Sleepless' album on BMG Records. In 2007 they collaborated on 'Calling to Say' for EMI artist Serena Ryder, which rose to No. 1 on the Canadian charts.

Bradley's work on Nelly Furtado's third album 'Loose' brought him to the attention of Los Angeles writer-producer Rick Nowels resulting in collaborations on material for Joss Stone, Kylie Minogue, Charlotte Church and Shaznay Lewis of All Saints. Holly Knight, another Los Angeles writer-producer brought Bradley in to work on material for The Donnas, Alaina Beaton and Joe Elliot of Def Leppard.

In 2009 Bradley began composing music for film and theatre. He was nominated for an Outstanding Sound Design/Composition Dora Award for the Darren Anthony play Secrets of a Black Boy.

== Solo singer-songwriter work ==
In 2006 Bradley released 'Deep Freeze', his first solo album as a singer-songwriter, on Prozzak/Philosopher Kings guitarist James Bryan's label UMI Records. In Canadian newspaper The National Post interviewer Mike Doherty refers to 'Bradley's trademark piano, which sounds as though it were recorded underwater'^{2}. In that article, Bradley explains that his breathy vocals and organic piano sound are intentionally set against inhuman, icy beats and sterile analog synthesizer sweeps to accentuate their warmth and humanness by contrast. In 2006 and 2007 Bradley toured the album in Canada with James Bryan's project Sunshine State. The tracks 'In The Way', 'Games', 'Love Song 1968', 'I Wonder Where You Are' and 'Deep Freeze' enjoyed radio play in Canada and the U.S.

'Daylight Fading Out' followed in 2012 and the 'Sea & Space' EP in 2013, both on Bradley's own Afternoon Tea label.

The dual-album project 'Quiet Life' and 'Violet Life' released digitally on October 14, 2022, features 10 songs presented with the same lead vocal but with a jazz trio and electronic backdrop respectively. The podcast series 'Liner Notes' chronicled the making of the albums.

== House music projects ==
Under the alias Gavo, Bradley has also produced a steady stream of remixes including work for Atlantic Records artist Tori Amos, EMI artist Thomas Dolby and Nelly Furtado. In 2000 his remix of Furtado's 'I'm Like A Bird' was cited as a Dance Hot Plate in Billboard Magazine.

Bradley also maintains ongoing collaborations with Toronto DJ Dwayne Minard with disco-house project Righteous and electro-funk project White Punks On Dope. The Righteous single 'Love Is Love' featuring New York singer MJ White on vocals was released on the prestigious UK-based Hed Kandi label. White Punks On Dope have performed live at various locales around Toronto, including Shane Percy's Candybar party series in 2007. House singles recorded with Toronto DJ Deko-ze have been released on Toronto-based Hi-Bias Records under the moniker Deko-ze'n'Gavo.

== Solo discography ==
Gavin Bradley – "Deep Freeze" (Album 2006)
Gavin Bradley – "Daylight Fading Out (Album 2012)
Gavin Bradley – "Sea & Space" (EP 2013)
Gavin Bradley – "Quiet Life" (Album 2022)
Gavin Bradley – "Violet Life" (Album 2022)
Gavin Bradley – "A Day With Nothing Planned: Outtakes 2002–2012" (Compilation of outtakes & songs for film/TV)
Righteous ft. Gavin Bradley – "In The Way" Dwayne Minard ft. Gavin Bradley – "Hobbies" DJ Meme ft. Gavin Bradley – "The Sun Is Coming Out"
DJ Meme ft. Gavin Bradley – "Call For Me"
James Bryan & Gavin Bradley – "Kelly"
Gavin Bradley & James Bryan – "And I Love Her"
Gavin Bradley & James Bryan – "Norwegian Wood"
No-Lab ft. Gavin Bradley – "(I've Got To) Free Myself"

== Writing and production discography ==
All About Maggie – "Paint My Name"
All About Maggie – "Up Close To You"
Amanda Morra – "Rewind"
Amanda Morra – "Whiplash"
Amy Kate – "Leave The Right Way"
Anjulie – "Real Man"
Anjulie – "Today"
Canute Davis – "Traveling"
Cory Stewart – "Do You"
Cory Stewart – "Poison"
Cory Stewart - "Grab the Fire"
Cory Stewart - "Why Do I Even Try"
Cory Stewart - "7 Different Sides"
Dayna Manning – "Anytown"
Deko-ze'n'Gavo – "This Time"
Deko-ze'n'Gavo ft. Camille Douglas – "Explosive"
Deko-ze'n'Gavo – "Like A Fool"
Fritz Helder & The Phantoms – "Greatest Hits" (Full Length CD)
Gavo – "Four-Story House" (EP)
Gavin Bradley ft. Melissa Stylianou – "I Lose You"
Jordan Alexander – "Not That Girl"
Kenneth Thomas ft. Roberta Carter-Harrison & Steven Taetz – "Drive"
Lexi Tellings – "Nirvana"
Mackenta – "Over The Influence EP"
Mackenta – "Dawn"
Mackenta – "No Finesse"
Mackenta – "When The Poison Drained EP"
Parade Of Old Souls – "Little Locked Boxes" (Full Length CD)
Parade Of Old Souls – "Little Locked Remixes" (EP)
Parade Of Old Souls – "Statues" (Full Length CD)
Parade Of Old Souls – "Monuments" (EP)
Righteous – "The DJ Plays"
Righteous – "Soul Clappin'"
Serena Ryder – "Calling To Say (Merry Christmas)" – Canadian A/C Radio No. 1
Simone Denny – "Because Of Love"
Steve Foster – "Sad Love Song"
Tristan Jackson – "Antigravity"
Tristan Jackson – "Save The World Tonight"
White Punks On Dope ft Ricky Franco – "Emergency"
White Punks On Dope ft. Barbi Castelvi – "I'm Done"
White Punks On Dope – "Destination: House"
White Punks On Dope ft Fritz Helder – "Chemicalz"

== Production discography ==
Alaina Beaton – "Normal For A Day"
All About Maggie – "Running Away"
All About Maggie – "Sweetest Heartache"
Aviva Thierry – "Better Not Today"
Brother Love Canal – "A New Level" (EP)
Careless – "Close The Door"
Careless – "Never Far"
Charlotte Church – "Safe In My Arms"
Chrissie Hynde & Michel Bérubé – "Laisse-Moi T'Aimer"
Company Freak – "Get Myself Together"
The Donnas – "Here For The Party"
Dwayne Minard – "Habitat"
Esthero – "Windmills Of My Mind"
Esthero – "Getting Better"
Esthero – "Feelin' Alright"
Jacksoul – "Can't Stop" – Best R&B Juno Award
Jacksoul – "She's Gone"
Jacksoul – "I Miss You"
Joe Elliot – "Wanna Piece"
Joss Stone – "Unbreakable"
Kaci – "I Think I Love You" – UK Top 5
Kurt Stylez – "Car Wash"
Kylie Minogue – "Whenever You Feel Like It"
LeAnn Rimes – "You Are"
LP – "Till It's Over"
L.E.X. ft. Niki Haris – "Give Me The Music"
Micah Barnes – "Domesticated" (EP)
Nelly Furtado – "Special To You"
Nelly Furtado – "Run Away"
Righteous – "Stay Together"
Righteous – "Unknown Pleasures"
Righteous – "Solace"
Righteous – "MHR"
Righteous ft. MJ White – "Love Is Love"
Shaky Knees – "All That You Deserve"
Shaznay Lewis (All Saints) – "OMG"

== Vocal production discography ==
Andy Grammer – "Back Home (Single)"
Shawn Hook – "Believe You Now (Single)"
Jenn Bostic – "If You See Him (Single)"
Oceane Aqua-Black – "(Forthcoming LP)"
Smashby – "(Forthcoming LP)"
Syv De Blare – "Crash (Single)"
Syv De Blare – "Wake (Single)"
Syv De Blare – "Violence (Single)"
Mackenta – "Over The Influence (EP)"
Mackenta – "When The Poison Drained (EP)"
Devon Sedrick – "Fifty One Fifty (LP)"
Blake Rave – "After Midnight (Single)"
Blake Rave – "Never Broken (Single)"

== Remix discography ==
69 Duster – "Candy Girl"
Anne Murray – "Someone Else Today"
Beck – "Mixed Bizness"
Brandy – "Almost Doesn't Count"
Brother Love Canal – "So Far Away"
Carlos Morgan – "Feelin' Alright"
Carlos Morgan – "Get Down To It"
Company Freak – "Andre Leon Talley"
Cory Lee – "Play Dumb"
Dayna Manning – "I'm The Girl"
DVSN – "Hallucinations"
Dwayne Minard – "Butch Queen"
Erasure – "A Little Respect"
Donatella Movement ft. MJ White – "Love Can Be"
Esthero – "Heaven Sent"
Esthero – "Country Livin'"
Esthero – "That Girl"
Jacksoul – "Never Say Goodbye"
James Bryan – "Beautiful World"
James Bryan – "I Left My Heart In Brooklyn"
Jane Siberry – "The Taxi Ride"
Jane Siberry – "I Muse Aloud"
Jane Siberry – "Mimi On The Beach"
Jon Levine – "Hot Girls"
Keshia Chanté – "2U"
Mic Boogie – "Everybody's Doin' It"
Mic Boogie – "Good Look"
Nelly Furtado – "Party's Just Begun"
Nelly Furtado – "I'm Like A Bird" – Billboard Dance Hot Plate
Nelly Furtado – "Try"
The Nylons – "Smalltown Boy"
Mackenta – "Issues"
Michelle Blade – "Crying Over You"
Meeka – "Whatcha Gonna Do"
My Dear Heretic – "I'm Not Driving"
Rhea's Obsession – "Waves (Take Me Alive)"
Senor Kasio – "Big Fake Turkey"
Suzanne Nuttall – "Trophy Wife"
Syv de Blare – "Wake"
The Philosopher Kings – Supersex 69"
The Philosopher Kings – "Charms"
Public Enemy – "Public Enemy No. 1"
Thomas Dolby – "She Blinded Me With Science"
Tori Amos – "Horses" – Dance Music Authority citation
Tori Amos – "Putting The Damage On"
Usher – "You Make Me Wanna"

== Film and theatre composition ==
Secrets of a Black Boy (Play) – Outstanding Sound Design/Composition Dora Nomination
How Black Mothers Say I Love You (Play)
Bunny (Short Film)
Last Vestiges (Short Film)
Our Dance Of Revolution (Feature Documentary)
