= Principal ideal ring =

Ring in which every ideal is principal

In mathematics, a principal right (left) ideal ring is a ring R in which every right (left) ideal is of the form xR (Rx) for some element x of R. (The right and left ideals of this form, generated by one element, are called principal ideals.) When this is satisfied for both left and right ideals, such as the case when R is a commutative ring, R can be called a principal ideal ring, or simply principal ring.

If only the finitely generated right ideals of R are principal, then R is called a right Bézout ring. Left Bézout rings are defined similarly. These conditions are studied in domains as Bézout domains.

A principal ideal ring which is also an integral domain is said to be a principal ideal domain (PID). In this article the focus is on the more general concept of a principal ideal ring which is not necessarily a domain.

== General properties ==
If R is a principal right ideal ring, then it is certainly a right Noetherian ring, since every right ideal is finitely generated. It is also a right Bézout ring since all finitely generated right ideals are principal. Indeed, it is clear that principal right ideal rings are exactly the rings which are both right Bézout and right Noetherian.

Principal right ideal rings are closed under finite direct products. If $R=\prod_{i=1}^nR_i$, then each right ideal of R is of the form $A=\prod_{i=1}^nA_i$, where each $A_i$ is a right ideal of R_{i}. If all the R_{i} are principal right ideal rings, then A_{i}=x_{i}R_{i}, and then it can be seen that $(x_1,\ldots,x_n)R=A$. Without much more effort, it can be shown that right Bézout rings are also closed under finite direct products.

Principal right ideal rings and right Bézout rings are also closed under quotients, that is, if I is a proper ideal of principal right ideal ring R, then the quotient ring R/I is also principal right ideal ring. This follows readily from the isomorphism theorems for rings.

All properties above have left analogues as well.

== Commutative examples ==
1. The ring of integers: $\mathbb{Z}$
2. The integers modulo n: $\mathbb{Z}/n\mathbb{Z}$.
3. Let $R_1,\ldots,R_n$ be rings and $R = \prod_{i=1}^n R_i$. Then R is a principal ring if and only if R_{i} is a principal ring for all i.
4. The localization of a principal ring at any multiplicative subset is again a principal ring. Similarly, any quotient of a principal ring is again a principal ring.
5. Let R be a Dedekind domain and I be a nonzero ideal of R. Then the quotient R/I is a principal ring. Indeed, we may factor I as a product of prime powers: $I = \prod_{i=1}^n P_i^{a_i}$, and by the Chinese Remainder Theorem $R/I \cong \prod_{i=1}^n R/P_i^{a_i}$, so it suffices to see that each $R/P_i^{a_i}$ is a principal ring. But $R/P_i^{a_i}$ is isomorphic to the quotient $R_{P_i}/P_i^{a_i} R_{P_i}$ of the discrete valuation ring $R_{P_i}$ and, being a quotient of a principal ring, is itself a principal ring.
6. Let k be a finite field and put $A = k[x,y]$, $\mathfrak{m} = \langle x, y \rangle$ and $R = A/\mathfrak{m}^2$. Then R is a finite local ring which is not principal.
7. Let X be a finite set. Then $(\mathcal{P}(X),\Delta,\cap)$ forms a commutative principal ideal ring with unity, where $\Delta$ represents set symmetric difference and $\mathcal{P}(X)$ represents the powerset of X. If X has at least two elements, then the ring also has zero divisors. If I is an ideal, then $I=(\bigcup I)$. If instead X is infinite, the ring is not principal: take the ideal generated by the finite subsets of X, for example.
8. Galois rings are commutative local PIRs. They are constructed from the integers modulo $p^k$ in essentially the same way that finite field extensions of the integers modulo $p$, and the maximal ideal is generated by $p$.

== Structure theory for commutative PIR's ==
The principal rings constructed in Example 5 above are always Artinian rings; in particular they are isomorphic to a finite direct product of principal Artinian local rings. A local Artinian principal ring is called a special principal ring and has an extremely simple ideal structure: there are only finitely many ideals, each of which is a power of the maximal ideal. For this reason, special principal rings are examples of uniserial rings.

The following result gives a complete classification of principal rings in terms of special principal rings and principal ideal domains.

Zariski–Samuel theorem: Let R be a principal ring. Then R can be written as a direct product $\prod_{i=1}^n R_i$, where each R_{i} is either a principal ideal domain or a special principal ring.

The proof applies the Chinese Remainder theorem to a minimal primary decomposition of the zero ideal.

There is also the following result, due to Hungerford:

Theorem (Hungerford): Let R be a principal ring. Then R can be written as a direct product $\prod_{i=1}^n R_i$, where each R_{i} is a quotient of a principal ideal domain.

The proof of Hungerford's theorem employs Cohen's structure theorems for complete local rings.

Arguing as in Example 3. above and using the Zariski-Samuel theorem, it is easy to check that Hungerford's theorem is equivalent to the statement that any special principal ring is the quotient of a discrete valuation ring.

== Noncommutative examples ==
Every semisimple ring R which is not just a product of fields is a noncommutative right and left principal ideal ring (it need not be a domain, as the example of n x n matrices over a field shows). Every right and left ideal is a direct summand of R, and so is of the form eR or Re where e is an idempotent of R. Paralleling this example, von Neumann regular rings are seen to be both right and left Bézout rings.

If D is a division ring and $\sigma$ is a ring endomorphism which is not an automorphism, then the skew polynomial ring $D[x,\sigma]$ is known to be a principal left ideal domain which is not right Noetherian, and hence it cannot be a principal right ideal ring. This shows that even for domains principal left and principal right ideal rings are different.
