= Abelian von Neumann algebra =

In functional analysis, a branch of mathematics, an abelian von Neumann algebra is a von Neumann algebra of operators on a Hilbert space in which all elements commute.

The prototypical example of an abelian von Neumann algebra is the algebra L^{∞}(X, μ) for μ a σ-finite measure on X realized as an algebra of operators on the Hilbert space L^{2}(X, μ) as follows: Each f ∈ L^{∞}(X, μ) is identified with the multiplication operator

$$\psi \mapsto f \psi.$$

Of particular importance are the abelian von Neumann algebras on separable Hilbert spaces, particularly since they are completely classifiable by simple invariants.

Though there is a theory for von Neumann algebras on non-separable Hilbert spaces (and indeed much of the general theory still holds in that case) the theory is considerably simpler for algebras on separable spaces and most applications to other areas of mathematics or physics only use separable Hilbert spaces. Note that if the measure space (X, μ) is a standard measure space (that is X − N is a standard Borel space for some null set N and μ is a σ-finite measure) then L^{2}(X, μ) is separable.

== Classification ==
The relationship between commutative von Neumann algebras and measure spaces is analogous to that between commutative C*-algebras and locally compact Hausdorff spaces. Every commutative von Neumann algebra on a separable Hilbert space is isomorphic to L^{∞}(X) for some standard measure space (X, μ) and conversely, for every standard measure space X, L^{∞}(X) is a von Neumann algebra. This isomorphism as stated is an algebraic isomorphism. In fact we can state this more precisely as follows:

Theorem. Any abelian von Neumann algebra of operators on a separable Hilbert space is *-isomorphic to exactly one of the following

- $\ell^\infty(\{1,2, \ldots, n\}), \quad n \geq 1$
- $\ell^\infty(\mathbf{N})$
- $L^\infty([0,1])$
- $L^\infty([0,1] \cup \{1,2, \ldots, n\}), \quad n \geq 1$
- $L^\infty([0,1] \cup \mathbf{N}).$

The isomorphism can be chosen to preserve the weak operator topology.

In the above list, the unions are disjoint unions, the interval [0,1] has Lebesgue measure and the sets {1, 2, ..., n} and N have counting measure. This classification is essentially a variant of Maharam's classification theorem for separable measure algebras. The version of Maharam's classification theorem that is most useful involves a point realization of the equivalence, and is somewhat of a folk theorem.

Although every standard measure space is isomorphic to one of the above and the list is exhaustive in this sense, there is a more canonical choice for the measure space in the case of abelian von Neumann algebras A: The set of all projectors is a $\sigma$-complete Boolean algebra, that is a pointfree $\sigma$-algebra. In the special case $A=L^\infty(X,\mathfrak{A},\mu)$ one recovers the abstract $\sigma$-algebra $\mathfrak{A}/\{A \mid \mu(A)=0\}$. This pointfree approach can be turned into a duality theorem analogue to Gelfand-duality between the category of abelian von Neumann algebras and the category of abstract $\sigma$-algebras.

Let μ and ν be non-atomic probability measures on standard Borel spaces X and Y respectively. Then there is a μ null subset N of X, a ν null subset M of Y and a Borel isomorphism

$$\phi: X \setminus N \rightarrow Y \setminus M, \quad$$

which carries μ into ν.

Notice that in the above result, it is necessary to clip away sets of measure zero to make the result work.

In the above theorem, the isomorphism is required to preserve the weak operator topology. As it turns out (and follows easily from the definitions), for algebras L^{∞}(X, μ), the following topologies agree on norm bounded sets:

1. The weak operator topology on L^{∞}(X, μ);
2. The ultraweak operator topology on L^{∞}(X, μ);
3. The topology of weak* convergence on L^{∞}(X, μ) considered as the dual space of L^{1}(X, μ).

However, for an abelian von Neumann algebra A the realization of A as an algebra of operators on a separable Hilbert space is highly non-unique. The complete classification of the operator algebra realizations of A is given by spectral multiplicity theory and requires the use of direct integrals.

== Spatial isomorphism ==
Using direct integral theory, it can be shown that the abelian von Neumann algebras of the form L^{∞}(X, μ) acting as operators on L^{2}(X, μ) are all maximal abelian. This means that they cannot be extended to properly larger abelian algebras. They are also referred to as Maximal abelian self-adjoint algebras (or M.A.S.A.s). Another phrase used to describe them is abelian von Neumann algebras of uniform multiplicity 1; this description makes sense only in relation to multiplicity theory described below.

Von Neumann algebras A on H, B on K are spatially isomorphic (or unitarily isomorphic) if and only if there is a unitary operator U: H → K such that

$$U A U^* = B.$$

In particular spatially isomorphic von Neumann algebras are algebraically isomorphic.

To describe the most general abelian von Neumann algebra on a separable Hilbert space H up to spatial isomorphism, we need to refer the direct integral decomposition of H. The details of this decomposition are discussed in decomposition of abelian von Neumann algebras. In particular:

Theorem Any abelian von Neumann algebra on a separable Hilbert space H is spatially isomorphic to L^{∞}(X, μ) acting on

$$\int_X^\oplus H(x) \, d \mu(x)$$

for some measurable family of Hilbert spaces {H_{x}}_{x ∈ X}.

Note that for abelian von Neumann algebras acting on such direct integral spaces, the equivalence of the weak operator topology, the ultraweak topology and the weak* topology on norm bounded sets still hold.

== Point and spatial realization of automorphisms ==
Many problems in ergodic theory reduce to problems about automorphisms of abelian von Neumann algebras. In that regard, the following results are useful:

Theorem. Suppose μ, ν are standard measures on X, Y respectively. Then any involutive isomorphism

$$\Phi: L^\infty(X, \mu) \rightarrow L^\infty(Y, \nu)$$

which is weak*-bicontinuous corresponds to a point transformation in the following sense: There are Borel null subsets M of X and N of Y and a Borel isomorphism

$$\eta: X \setminus M \rightarrow Y \setminus N$$

such that

1. η carries the measure μ into a measure μ' on Y which is equivalent to ν in the sense that μ' and ν have the same sets of measure zero;
2. η realizes the transformation Φ, that is

$$\Phi (f) = f \circ \eta^{-1}.$$

Note that in general we cannot expect η to carry μ into ν.

The next result concerns unitary transformations which induce a weak*-bicontinuous isomorphism between abelian von Neumann algebras.

Theorem. Suppose μ, ν are standard measures on X, Y and

$$H = \int_X^\oplus H_x d \mu(x), \quad K = \int_Y^\oplus K_y d \nu(y)$$

for measurable families of Hilbert spaces {H_{x}}_{x ∈ X}, {K_{y}}_{y ∈ Y}. If U : H → K is a unitary such that

$$U \, L^\infty(X, \mu) \, U^* = L^\infty(Y, \nu)$$

then there is an almost everywhere defined Borel point transformation η : X → Y as in the previous theorem and a measurable family {U_{x}}_{x ∈ X} of unitary operators

$$U_x: H_x \rightarrow K_{\eta(x)}$$

such that

$$U \bigg(\int_X^\oplus \psi_x d \mu(x) \bigg)= \int_Y^\oplus \sqrt{ \frac{d (\mu \circ \eta^{-1})}{d \nu}(y)} \ U_{\eta^{-1}(y)} \bigg(\psi_{\eta^{-1}(y)}\bigg) d \nu(y),$$

where the expression in square root sign is the Radon–Nikodym derivative of μ η^{−1} with respect to ν. The statement follows combining the theorem on point realization of automorphisms stated above with the theorem characterizing the algebra of diagonalizable operators stated in the article on direct integrals.
