= Infinite tensor product =

In ring theory, the infinite tensor product generalizes the tensor product to possibly infinite families of associative algebras.

== Definition ==
The infinite tensor product of a family of algebras $(A_i)_{i\in I}$ over a commutative ring $K$ is the $K$-algebra

$$\bigotimes_{i\in I}A_i=\varinjlim_{{J\subseteq I\atop|J|<\aleph_0}}\bigotimes_{i\in J}A_i.$$

The limit on the right side is the inductive limit in the category of $K$-algebras. So, the infinite tensor product is defined as the inductive limit of the finite tensor products; the finite tensor products are well-defined, by the associativity of the tensor product up to coherent isomorphism.

The infinite tensor products of commutative algebras are commutative algebras. They are precisely the coproducts in the category of $K$-commutative algebras. The universal property for the infinite tensor products of $K$-algebras is less elegant in that it requires that the images of the canonical mappings commute.
