= Tomita–Takesaki theory =

Mathematical method in functional analysis

In the theory of von Neumann algebras, a part of the mathematical field of functional analysis, Tomita–Takesaki theory is a method for constructing modular automorphisms of von Neumann algebras from the polar decomposition of a certain involution. It is essential for the theory of type III factors, and has led to a good structure theory for these previously intractable objects.

The theory was introduced by Minoru Tomita (1967), but his work was hard to follow and mostly unpublished, and little notice was taken of it until Masamichi Takesaki (1970) wrote an account of Tomita's theory.

== Modular automorphisms of a state ==
Suppose that M is a von Neumann algebra acting on a Hilbert space H, and Ω is a cyclic and separating vector of H of norm 1. (Cyclic means that MΩ is dense in H, and separating means that the map from M to MΩ is injective.) We write $\phi$ for the vector state $\phi(x) = (x\Omega, \Omega)$ of M, so that H is constructed from $\phi$ using the Gelfand–Naimark–Segal construction. Since Ω is separating, $\phi$ is faithful.

We can define a (not necessarily bounded) antilinear operator S_{0} on H with dense domain MΩ by setting $S_0(m\Omega) = m^*\Omega$ for all m in M, and similarly we can define a (not necessarily bounded) antilinear operator F_{0} on H with dense domain M'Ω by setting $F_0(m\Omega) = m^*\Omega$ for m in M′, where M′ is the commutant of M.

These operators are closable, and we denote their closures by S and F = S*. They have polar decompositions

$$\begin{align}
S = J|S| &= J\Delta^\frac{1}{2} = \Delta^{-\frac{1}{2}}J \\
F = J|F| &= J\Delta^{-\frac{1}{2}} = \Delta^\frac{1}{2}J
\end{align}$$

where $J = J^{-1} = J^*$ is an antilinear isometry of H called the modular conjugation and $\Delta = S^*S = FS$ is a positive (hence, self-adjoint) and densely defined operator called the modular operator.

=== Commutation theorem ===
The main result of Tomita–Takesaki theory states that:

$$\Delta^{it}M\Delta^{-it} = M$$

for all t and that

$$JMJ = M',$$

the commutant of M.

There is a 1-parameter group of modular automorphisms $\sigma^{\phi_t}$ of M associated with the state $\phi$, defined by $\sigma^{\phi_t}(x) = \Delta^{it}x\Delta^{-it}$.

The modular conjugation operator J and the 1-parameter unitary group $\Delta^{it}$ satisfy

$$J\Delta^{it}J =\Delta^{it}$$

and

$$J\Delta J = \Delta^{-1}.$$

== The Connes cocycle ==
The modular automorphism group of a von Neumann algebra M depends on the choice of state φ. Connes discovered that changing the state does not change the image of the modular automorphism in the outer automorphism group of M. More precisely, given two faithful states φ and ψ of M, we can find unitary elements u_{t} of M for all real t such that

$$\sigma^{\psi_t}(x) = u_t\sigma^{\phi_t}(x)u_t^{-1}$$

so that the modular automorphisms differ by inner automorphisms, and moreover u_{t} satisfies the 1-cocycle condition

$$u_{s+t} = u_s\sigma^{\phi_s}(u_t)$$

In particular, there is a canonical homomorphism from the additive group of reals to the outer automorphism group of M, that is independent of the choice of faithful state.

== KMS states ==
The term KMS state comes from the Kubo–Martin–Schwinger condition in quantum statistical mechanics.

A KMS state $\phi$ on a von Neumann algebra M with a given 1-parameter group of automorphisms α_{t} is a state fixed by the automorphisms such that for every pair of elements A, B of M there is a bounded continuous function F in the strip 0 ≤ Im(t) ≤ 1, holomorphic in the interior, such that

$$\begin{align}
F(t) &= \phi(A\alpha_t(B)),\\
F(t + i) &= \phi(\alpha_t(B)A)
\end{align}$$

Takesaki and Winnink showed that any (faithful semi finite normal) state $\phi$ is a KMS state for the 1-parameter group of modular automorphisms $\sigma^{\phi_{-t}}$. Moreover, this characterizes the modular automorphisms of $\phi$.

(There is often an extra parameter, denoted by β, used in the theory of KMS states. In the description above this has been normalized to be 1 by rescaling the 1-parameter family of automorphisms.)

== Structure of type III factors ==
We have seen above that there is a canonical homomorphism δ from the group of reals to the outer automorphism group of a von Neumann algebra, given by modular automorphisms. The kernel of δ is an important invariant of the algebra. For simplicity assume that the von Neumann algebra is a factor. Then the possibilities for the kernel of δ are:

- The whole real line. In this case δ is trivial and the factor is type I or II.
- A proper dense subgroup of the real line. Then the factor is called a factor of type III_{0}.
- A discrete subgroup generated by some x > 0. Then the factor is called a factor of type III_{λ} with 0 < λ = exp(−2π/x) < 1, or sometimes a Powers factor.
- The trivial group 0. Then the factor is called a factor of type III_{1}. (This is in some sense the generic case.)

== Left Hilbert algebras ==
The main results of Tomita–Takesaki theory were proved using left and right Hilbert algebras.

A left Hilbert algebra is an algebra $\mathfrak A$ with involution x → x^{♯} and an inner product (·,·) such that

1. Left multiplication by a fixed a ∈ $\mathfrak A$ is a bounded operator.
2. ♯ is the adjoint; in other words (xy, z) = (y, x^{♯}z).
3. The involution ^{♯} is preclosed.
4. The subalgebra spanned by all products xy is dense in $\mathfrak |$ w.r.t. the inner product.

A right Hilbert algebra is defined similarly (with an involution ♭) with left and right reversed in the conditions above.

A (unimodular) Hilbert algebra is a left Hilbert algebra for which ♯ is an isometry, in other words (x, y) = (y^{♯}, x^{♯}). In this case the involution is denoted by x* instead of x^{♯} and coincides with modular conjugation J. This is the special case of Hilbert algebras. The modular operator is trivial and the corresponding von Neumann algebra is a direct sum of type I and type II von Neumann algebras.

Examples:

- If M is a von Neumann algebra acting on a Hilbert space H with a cyclic separating unit vector v, then put $\mathfrak A$ = Mv and define (xv)(yv) = xyv and (xv)^{♯} = x*v. The vector v is the identity of $\mathfrak A$, so $\mathfrak A$ is a unital left Hilbert algebra.
- If G is a locally compact group, then the vector space of all continuous complex functions on G with compact support is a right Hilbert algebra if multiplication is given by convolution, and x^{♭}(g) = x(g^{−1})*.

For a fixed left Hilbert algebra $\mathfrak A$, let H be its Hilbert space completion. Left multiplication by x yields a bounded operator λ(x) on H and hence a *-homomorphism λ of $\mathfrak A$ into B(H). The *-algebra $\lambda({\mathfrak A})$ generates the von Neumann algebra

$${\cal R}_\lambda({\mathfrak A}) = \lambda({\mathfrak A})^{\prime\prime}.$$

Tomita's key discovery concerned the remarkable properties of the closure of the operator ^{♯} and its polar decomposition. If S denotes this closure (a conjugate-linear unbounded operator), let Δ = S* S, a positive unbounded operator. Let S = J Δ^{1/2} denote its polar decomposition. Then J is a conjugate-linear isometry satisfying

$S=S^{-1},\,\,\,$ $J^2 =I,\,\,\,$ $J\Delta J =\Delta^{-1}\,\,\,$and $\, S=\Delta^{-1/2} J$.

Δ is called the modular operator and J the modular conjugation.

In Takesaki (2003, pp. 5–17), there is a self-contained proof of the main commutation theorem of Tomita-Takesaki:

$\Delta^{it}{\cal R}_\lambda({\mathfrak A})\Delta^{-it} = {\cal R}_\lambda({\mathfrak A})\,\,$ and $\,\,J{\cal R}_\lambda({\mathfrak A})J = {\cal R}_\lambda({\mathfrak A})^{\prime}.$

The proof hinges on evaluating the operator integral:

$$e^{s/2} \Delta^{1/2}\,(\Delta + e^s)^{-1} =  \int_{-\infty}^\infty {e^{-ist}\over e^{\pi t} + e^{-\pi t}} \,\Delta^{it} \, {\rm d} t.$$

By the spectral theorem, that is equivalent to proving the equality with e^{x} replacing Δ; the identity for scalars follows by contour integration. It reflects the well-known fact that, with a suitable normalisation, the function ${\rm sech}$ is its own Fourier transform.
