= Center (algebra) =

A diagram showing the center of a circle

The term center or centre is used in various contexts in abstract algebra to denote the set of all those elements that commute with all other elements.

- The center of a group G consists of all those elements x in G such that xg = gx for all g in G. This is a normal subgroup of G.
- The similarly named notion for a semigroup is defined likewise and it is a subsemigroup.
- The center of a ring (or an associative algebra) R is the subset of R consisting of all those elements x of R such that xr = rx for all r in R. The center is a commutative subring of R.
- The center of a Lie algebra L consists of all those elements x in L such that [x,a] = 0 for all a in L. This is an ideal of the Lie algebra L.

== See also ==
- Centralizer and normalizer
- Center (category theory)
