= Von Neumann regular ring =

Rings admitting weak inverses

In mathematics, a von Neumann regular ring is a ring R (associative, with 1, not necessarily commutative) such that for every element a in R there exists an x in R with a = axa. One may think of x as a "weak inverse" of the element a; in general x is not uniquely determined by a. Von Neumann regular rings are also called absolutely flat rings, because these rings are characterized by the fact that every left R-module is flat.

Von Neumann regular rings were introduced by von Neumann (1936) under the name of "regular rings", in the course of his study of von Neumann algebras and continuous geometry. Von Neumann regular rings should not be confused with the unrelated regular rings and regular local rings of commutative algebra.

An element a of a ring is called a von Neumann regular element if there exists an x such that a = axa. An ideal $\mathfrak{i}$ is called a (von Neumann) regular ideal if for every element a in $\mathfrak{i}$ there exists an element x in $\mathfrak{i}$ such that a = axa.

== Examples ==
Every field (and every skew field) is von Neumann regular: for a ≠ 0 we can take x = a^{−1}. An integral domain is von Neumann regular if and only if it is a field. Every direct product of von Neumann regular rings is again von Neumann regular.

Another important class of examples of von Neumann regular rings are the rings M_{n}(K) of n-by-n square matrices with entries from some field K. If r is the rank of A ∈ M_{n}(K), Gaussian elimination gives invertible matrices U and V such that

$$A = U \begin{pmatrix}I_r &0\\
0 &0\end{pmatrix} V$$

(where I_{r} is the r-by-r identity matrix). If we set X = V^{−1}U^{−1}, then

$$AXA= U \begin{pmatrix}I_r &0\\
0 &0\end{pmatrix} \begin{pmatrix}I_r &0\\
0 &0\end{pmatrix} V = U \begin{pmatrix}I_r &0\\
0 &0\end{pmatrix} V = A.$$

More generally, the n × n matrix ring over any von Neumann regular ring is again von Neumann regular.

If V is a vector space over a field (or skew field) K, then the endomorphism ring End_{K}(V) is von Neumann regular, even if V is not finite-dimensional.

Generalizing the above examples, suppose S is some ring and M is an S-module such that every submodule of M is a direct summand of M (such modules M are called semisimple). Then the endomorphism ring End_{S}(M) is von Neumann regular. In particular, every semisimple ring is von Neumann regular. Indeed, the semisimple rings are precisely the Noetherian von Neumann regular rings.

The ring of affiliated operators of a finite von Neumann algebra is von Neumann regular.

A Boolean ring is a ring in which every element satisfies a^{2} = a. Every Boolean ring is von Neumann regular.

== Facts ==
The following statements are equivalent for the ring R:

- R is von Neumann regular
- every principal left ideal is generated by an idempotent element
- every finitely generated left ideal is generated by an idempotent
- every principal left ideal is a direct summand of the left R-module R
- every finitely generated left ideal is a direct summand of the left R-module R
- every finitely generated submodule of a projective left R-module P is a direct summand of P
- every left R-module is flat: this is also known as R being absolutely flat, or R having weak dimension 0
- every short exact sequence of left R-modules is pure exact.

The corresponding statements for right modules are also equivalent to R being von Neumann regular.

Every von Neumann regular ring has Jacobson radical {0} and is thus semiprimitive (also called "Jacobson semi-simple").

In a commutative von Neumann regular ring, for each element x there is a unique element y such that xyx = x and yxy = y, so there is a canonical way to choose the "weak inverse" of x.

The following statements are equivalent for the commutative ring R:

- R is von Neumann regular.
- R has Krull dimension 0 and is reduced.
- Every localization of R at a maximal ideal is a field.
- R is a subring of a product of fields closed under taking "weak inverses" of x ∈ R (the unique element y such that xyx = x and yxy = y).
- R is a V-ring.
- R has the right-lifting property against the ring homomorphism Z[t] → Z[t^{±}] × Z determined by t ↦ (t, 0), or said geometrically, every regular function $\mathrm{Spec}(R) \to \mathbb{A}^1$ factors through the morphism of schemes $\{0\} \sqcup \mathbb{G}_m \to \mathbb{A}^1$.

Also, the following are equivalent: for a commutative ring A

- R = A / nil(A) is von Neumann regular.
- The spectrum of A is Hausdorff (in the Zariski topology).
- The constructible topology and Zariski topology for Spec(A) coincide.

== Generalizations and specializations ==
Special types of von Neumann regular rings include unit regular rings and strongly von Neumann regular rings and rank rings.

A ring R is called unit regular if for every a in R, there is a unit u in R such that a = aua. Every semisimple ring is unit regular, and unit regular rings are directly finite rings. An ordinary von Neumann regular ring need not be directly finite.

A ring R is called strongly von Neumann regular if for every a in R, there is some x in R with a = aax. The condition is left-right symmetric. Strongly von Neumann regular rings are unit regular. Every strongly von Neumann regular ring is a subdirect product of division rings. In some sense, this more closely mimics the properties of commutative von Neumann regular rings, which are subdirect products of fields. For commutative rings, von Neumann regular and strongly von Neumann regular are equivalent. In general, the following are equivalent for a ring R:

- R is strongly von Neumann regular
- R is von Neumann regular and reduced
- R is von Neumann regular and every idempotent in R is central
- Every principal left ideal of R is generated by a central idempotent

Generalizations of von Neumann regular rings include π-regular rings, left/right semihereditary rings, left/right nonsingular rings and semiprimitive rings.

== See also ==
- Regular semigroup
- Weak inverse
