= Beta rectangular distribution =

Concept in statistics

Beta Rectangular
- Probability density function

- Cumulative distribution function
- Parameters: $\alpha > 0$ shape (real) $\beta > 0$ shape (real) $0<\theta <1$ mixture parameter
- Support: $x \in (a, b)\!$
- PDF: $$\begin{cases} \frac{\theta \Gamma(\alpha + \beta)}{\Gamma(\alpha)\Gamma(\beta)} \frac{(x - a)^{\alpha-1}  (b-x)^{\beta - 1} }{(b - a)^{\alpha + \beta - 1}} + \frac{1 - \theta}{b-a} & \text{for } x \in [a,b]  \\ 0               & \text{otherwise} \end{cases}$$
- CDF: $$\begin{cases} 0               & \text{for } x \le a \\ \theta I_z(\alpha,\beta) + \frac{(1-\theta)(x-a)}{b-a} & \text{for } x \in [a,b] \\ 1               & \text{for } x \ge b \end{cases}$$ where $z=(x-a)/(b-a)$
- Mean: $a + (b-a) \left(\frac{\theta \alpha}{\alpha + \beta} + \frac{1-\theta}{2} \right)$
- Variance: $(b-a)^2\left(\frac{\theta\,\alpha(\alpha+1)}{k(k+1)} + \frac{1-\theta}{3} - \frac{\bigl(k+\theta(\alpha-\beta)\bigr)^2}{4k^2}\right)$ where $k=\alpha+\beta$

In probability theory and statistics, the beta rectangular distribution is a probability distribution that is a finite mixture distribution of the beta distribution and the continuous uniform distribution. The support of the distribution is indicated by the parameters a and b, which are the minimum and maximum values respectively. The distribution provides an alternative to the beta distribution such that it allows more density to be placed at the extremes of the bounded interval of support. Thus it is a bounded distribution that allows for outliers to have a greater chance of occurring than does the beta distribution.

== Definition ==
=== Probability density function ===
If parameters of the beta distribution are α and β, and if the mixture parameter is θ, then the beta rectangular distribution has probability density function

$$p(x|\alpha, \beta, \theta)=\begin{cases}
\frac{\theta \Gamma(\alpha + \beta)}{\Gamma(\alpha)\Gamma(\beta)}
\frac{(x - a)^{\alpha-1}  (b-x)^{\beta - 1} }{(b - a)^{\alpha + \beta - 1}}
+ \frac{1 - \theta}{b-a}
& \mathrm{for}\ a \le x \le b, \\[8pt]
0 & \mathrm{for}\ x<a\ \mathrm{or}\ x>b
\end{cases}$$

where $\Gamma(\cdot)$ is the gamma function.

=== Cumulative distribution function ===
The cumulative distribution function is

$$F(x|\alpha, \beta, \theta)=
\theta I_z(\alpha,\beta) + \frac{(1-\theta)(x - a)}{b-a} \quad \quad \mathrm{  for}\ a \le x \le b,$$

where $z=\dfrac{x-a}{b-a}$ and $I_z(\alpha,\beta)$ is the regularized incomplete beta function.

== Applications ==
=== Project management ===
The PERT distribution variation of the beta distribution is frequently used in PERT, critical path method (CPM) and other project management methodologies to characterize the distribution of an activity's time to completion.

In PERT, restrictions on the PERT distribution parameters lead to shorthand computations for the mean and standard deviation of the beta distribution:

$$\begin{align}
E(x) & {} = \frac{a + 4m + b}{6} \\
\operatorname{Var} (x) & {} = \frac{(b-a)^2}{36}
\end{align}$$

where a is the minimum, b is the maximum, and m is the mode or most likely value. However, the variance is seen to be a constant conditional on the range. As a result, there is no scope for expressing differing levels of uncertainty that the project manager might have about the activity time.

Eliciting the beta rectangular's certainty parameter θ allows the project manager to incorporate the rectangular distribution and increase uncertainty by specifying θ is less than 1. The above expectation formula then becomes

$$E(x) = \frac{\theta(a+4m+b) + 3(1-\theta)(a+b)}{6} .$$

If the project manager assumes the beta distribution is symmetric under the standard PERT conditions then the variance is

$$\operatorname{Var} (x) = \frac{(b-a)^2 (3-2\theta)}{36} ,$$

while for the asymmetric case it is

$$\operatorname{Var} (x) = \frac{(b-a)^2(3-2\theta^2)}{36}.$$

The variance can now be increased when uncertainty is larger. However, the beta distribution may still apply depending on the project manager's judgment.

The beta rectangular has been compared to the uniform-two sided power distribution and the uniform-generalized biparabolic distribution in the context of project management. The beta rectangular exhibited larger variance and smaller kurtosis by comparison.

=== Income distributions ===
The beta rectangular distribution has been compared to the elevated two-sided power distribution in fitting U.S. income data. The 5-parameter elevated two-sided power distribution was found to have a better fit for some subpopulations, while the 3-parameter beta rectangular was found to have a better fit for other subpopulations.
