= Slender =

Slender may refer to:

== Term ==
- Gracility or slenderness
- Underweight

== Literature ==
- Abraham Slender, a character in William Shakespeare's The Merry Wives of Winsor

== Slender Man ==
- Slender Man, a fictional supernatural character
- Slender Man stabbing, an attempted murder inspired by the story of the "Slender Man"

== Species ==
- Slender-billed curlew, species of curlew native to Eurasia and North Africa
- Slender glass lizard, a legless lizard in the glass lizard subfamily
- Slender-billed vulture, an Old World vulture species native to sub-Himalayan regions and Southeast Asia

== See also ==
- Slender group
- Gracilis (disambiguation)
