= Skew normal distribution =

Probability distribution

Skew Normal
- Probability density function

- Cumulative distribution function
- Parameters: $\xi \,$ location (real) $\omega \,$ scale (positive, real) $\alpha \,$ shape (real)
- Support: $x \in (-\infty; +\infty)\!$
- PDF: $\frac{2}{\omega \sqrt{2 \pi}} e^{-\frac{(x-\xi)^2}{2\omega^2}} \int_{-\infty}^{\alpha\left(\frac{x-\xi}{\omega}\right)} \frac{1}{\sqrt{2 \pi}} e^{-\frac{t^2}{2}}\ \mathrm dt$
- CDF: $\Phi\left(\frac{x-\xi}{\omega}\right)-2T\left(\frac{x-\xi}{\omega},\alpha\right)$ $T(h,a)$ is Owen's T function
- Mean: $\xi + \omega\delta\sqrt{\frac{2}{\pi}}$ where $\delta = \frac{\alpha}{\sqrt{1+\alpha^2}}$
- Mode: $\xi + \omega m_o(\alpha)$
- Variance: $\omega^2\left(1 - \frac{2\delta^2}{\pi}\right)$
- Skewness: $\gamma_1 = \frac{4-\pi}{2} \frac{\left(\delta\sqrt{2/\pi}\right)^3}{ \left(1-2\delta^2/\pi\right)^{3/2}}$
- Excess kurtosis: $2(\pi - 3)\frac{\left(\delta\sqrt{2/\pi}\right)^4}{\left(1-2\delta^2/\pi\right)^2}$
- MGF: $M_X\left(t\right)=2\exp\left(\xi t+\frac{\omega^2t^2}{2}\right)\Phi\left(\omega\delta t\right)$
- CF: $e^{i t \xi -t^2\omega^2/2}\left(1+i\, \textrm{Erfi}\left(\frac{\delta\omega t}{\sqrt{2}}\right)\right)$

In probability theory and statistics, the skew normal distribution is a continuous probability distribution that generalises the normal distribution to allow for non-zero skewness.

== Definition ==
Let $\phi(x)$ denote the standard normal probability density function
$$\phi(x)=\frac{1}{\sqrt{2\pi}}e^{-\frac{x^2}{2}}$$
with the cumulative distribution function given by
$$\Phi(x) = \int_{-\infty}^{x} \phi(t)\ \mathrm dt = \frac{1}{2} \left[ 1 + \operatorname{erf} \left(\frac{x}{\sqrt{2}}\right)\right],$$

where "erf" is the error function. Then the probability density function (pdf) of the skew-normal distribution with parameter $\alpha$ is given by
$$f(x) = 2\phi(x)\Phi(\alpha x). \,$$

This distribution was first introduced by O'Hagan and Leonard (1976). Alternative forms to this distribution, with the corresponding quantile function, have been given by Ashour and Abdel-Hamid and by Mudholkar and Hutson.

A stochastic process that underpins the distribution was described by Andel, Netuka and Zvara (1984). Both the distribution and its stochastic process underpinnings were consequences of the symmetry argument developed in Chan and Tong (1986), which applies to multivariate cases beyond normality, e.g. skew multivariate t distribution and others. The distribution is a particular case of a general class of distributions with probability density functions of the form $f(x) = 2 \phi(x) \Phi(x)$ where $\phi(\cdot)$ is any PDF symmetric about zero and $\Phi(\cdot)$ is any CDF whose PDF is symmetric about zero.

To add location and scale parameters to this, one makes the usual transform $x\rightarrow\frac{x-\xi}{\omega}$. One can verify that the normal distribution is recovered when $\alpha = 0$, and that the absolute value of the skewness increases as the absolute value of $\alpha$ increases. The distribution is right skewed if $\alpha>0$ and is left skewed if $\alpha < 0$. The probability density function with location $\xi$, scale $\omega$, and parameter $\alpha$ becomes
$$f(x) = \frac{2}{\omega} \phi{\left(\frac{x-\xi}{\omega}\right)} \, \Phi{\left(\alpha \left(\frac{x-\xi}{\omega}\right)\right)}.$$
The skewness ($\gamma_1$) of the distribution is limited to slightly less than the interval $(-1,1)$.

As has been shown, the mode (maximum) $m_o$ of the distribution is unique. For general $\alpha$ there is no analytic expression for $m_o$, but a quite accurate (numerical) approximation is:

$$\begin{align}
\delta &= \frac{\alpha}{\sqrt{1+\alpha^2}} \\
m_o (\alpha) &\approx \sqrt{\frac{2}{\pi}}\delta - \left(1-\frac{\pi}{4}\right) \frac{\left(\sqrt{\frac{2}{\pi}}\delta\right)^3}{1-\frac{2}{\pi}\delta^2} - \frac{\mathrm{sgn}(\alpha)}{2} e^{-\frac{2 \pi}{|\alpha |}} \\
\end{align}$$

== Estimation ==
Maximum likelihood estimates for $\xi$, $\omega$, and $\alpha$ can be computed numerically, but no closed-form expression for the estimates is available unless $\alpha=0$. In contrast, the method of moments has a closed-form expression since the skewness equation can be inverted with

$$|\delta| = \sqrt{\frac{\pi}{2} \frac{ \left|\gamma_1\right|^{2/3}  }{ \left|\gamma_1\right|^{2/3} + \left(2 - \frac{\pi}{2}\right)^{2/3}}}$$

where $\delta = \frac{\alpha}{\sqrt{1+\alpha^2}}$ and the sign of $\delta$ is the same as the sign of $\gamma_1$. Consequently, $\alpha = \frac{\delta}{\sqrt{1-\delta^2}}$, $\omega = \frac{\sigma}{\sqrt{1-2\delta^2/\pi}}$, and $\xi=\mu-\omega\delta\sqrt{\frac{2}{\pi}}$ where $\mu$ and $\sigma$ are the mean and standard deviation. As long as the sample skewness $\hat{\gamma}_1$ is not too large, these formulas provide method of moments estimates $\hat\alpha$, $\hat\omega$, and $\hat\xi$ based on a sample's $\hat\mu$, $\hat\sigma$, and $\hat\gamma_1$.

The maximum (theoretical) skewness is obtained by setting ${\delta = 1}$ in the skewness equation, giving $\gamma_1 \approx 0.9952717$. However it is possible that the sample skewness is larger, and then $\alpha$ cannot be determined from these equations. When using the method of moments in an automatic fashion, for example to give starting values for maximum likelihood iteration, one should therefore let (for example) $\left|\hat{\gamma}_1\right| = \min\left(0.99, \left|\frac{1}{n}\sum_i {((x_i-\hat\mu)/\hat\sigma)^3}\right|\right)$.

Concern has been expressed about the inference of skew normal distributions using the direct parameterization.

== Related distributions ==
The exponentially modified normal distribution is another 3-parameter distribution that is a generalization of the normal distribution to skewed cases. The skew normal still has a normal-like tail in the direction of the skew, with a shorter tail in the other direction; that is, its density is asymptotically proportional to $e^{-kx^2}$ for some positive $k$. Thus, in terms of the seven states of randomness, it shows "proper mild randomness". In contrast, the exponentially modified normal has an exponential tail in the direction of the skew; its density is asymptotically proportional to $e^{-k|x|}$. In the same terms, it shows "borderline mild randomness".

Thus, the skew normal is useful for modeling skewed distributions which nevertheless have no more outliers than the normal, while the exponentially modified normal is useful for cases with an increased incidence of outliers in (just) one direction.

== See also ==
- Generalized normal distribution
- Log-normal distribution
