= Bulgarian solitaire =

Card game

In mathematics and game theory, Bulgarian solitaire is a card game that was introduced by Martin Gardner.

== Rules ==
In the game, a pack of $N$ cards is divided into several piles. Then for each pile, remove one card; collect the removed cards together to form a new pile (piles of zero size are ignored).

If $N$ is a triangular number (that is, $N=1+2+\cdots+k$ for some $k$), then it is known that Bulgarian solitaire will reach a stable configuration in which the sizes of the piles are $1,2,\ldots, k$. This state is reached in $k^2-k$ moves or fewer. If $N$ is not triangular, no stable configuration exists and a limit cycle is reached.

=== Random Bulgarian solitaire ===
In random Bulgarian solitaire or stochastic Bulgarian solitaire a pack of $N$ cards is divided into several piles. Then for each pile, either leave it intact or, with a fixed probability $p$, remove one card; collect the removed cards together to form a new pile (piles of zero size are ignored). This is a finite irreducible Markov chain.

== History ==
Martin Gardner introduced the game in the August 1983 issue of Scientific American.

In 2004, Brazilian probabilist Serguei Popov demonstrated that stochastic Bulgarian solitaire spends "most" of its time in a "roughly" triangular distribution.

== See also ==
- List of Martin Gardner Mathematical Games columns
