= TPDF =

TPDF may refer to:

- Tanzania People's Defence Force
- Triangular Probability Density Function, a type of distribution which is used in audio dithering
