= Daliapour =

Irish-bred Thoroughbred racehorse

- Sire: Sadler's Wells
- Grandsire: Northern Dancer
- Dam: Dalara
- Damsire: Doyoun
- Sex: Stallion
- Foaled: 10 March 1996
- Country: Ireland
- Colour: Bay
- Breeder: Aga Khan IV
- Owner: Aga Khan IV; Lucky Stable; Robert Ng
- Trainer: Luca Cumani; Michael Stoute; Ivan Allan; Michael Stoute
- Record: 26: 7-3-3
- Earnings: £1,313,934

Major wins
- Autumn Stakes (1998); Blue Riband Trial Stakes (1999); Ormonde Stakes (2000); Coronation Cup (2000); Hong Kong Vase (2000); Curragh Cup (2002)

Daliapour (10 March 1996 – 17 August 2015) is an Irish-bred Thoroughbred racehorse and sire. In a racing career which lasted from July 1998 until November 2002 he competed in seven different countries, running 26 times and winning seven races. The horse was bred by Aga Khan IV who owned him before selling him to Robert Ng in late 2000. He was originally trained by Luca Cumani before moving to Michael Stoute's stable in 2000. He was trained in Hong Kong by Ivan Allan for a few months in early 2001 before returning to Stoute for the remainder of his racing career.

Daliapour showed promise as a two-year-old by winning the Autumn Stakes and was a top-class performer at three, winning the Blue Riband Trial Stakes and finishing second in both The Derby and the Irish Derby. Daliapour reached his peak as a four-year-old in 2000 when he won the Ormonde Stakes, Coronation Cup and Hong Kong Vase. He failed to win as a five-year-old but showed some good form over longer distances at six, recording his last win in the 2002 Curragh Cup.

After his retirement from racing he stood as a breeding stallion in France and Australia with limited success. Daliapour died aged 19 in August 2015 as a result of laminitis.

== Background ==
Daliapour was a small bay horse with a white snip bred in Ireland by Aga Khan IV. He was from the eleventh crop of foals sired by Sadler's Wells, who won the Irish 2,000 Guineas, Eclipse Stakes and Irish Champion Stakes in 1984 went on to be the Champion sire on fourteen occasions. His dam Dalara was very good staying racemare who won the Prix de Royallieu and finished third in the Prix Royal-Oak. She was also a half-sister to Darara and Darshaan, both of whom were top-class racehorses who later excelled at stud.

The colt initially raced in the green and red colours of the Aga Khan and was sent into training with Luca Cumani at the Bedford House Stables in Newmarket.

== Racing career ==
=== 1998: two-year-old season ===
Daliapour began his racing career by finishing sixth to Enrique (later to finish second in the 2000 Guineas) in a seven furlong maiden race at Goodwood Racecourse on 31 July before recording his first success in a similar event over one mile at Chepstow a month later. He finished third to Boatman and Entertainer in the Haynes, Hanson and Clark Conditions Stakes at Newbury Racecourse on 18 September before ending his first season in the Listed Autumn Stakes at Ascot on 10 October. Ridden by Olivier Peslier and starting 2/1 second favourite in a seven-runner field, he disputed the lead from the start and drew away in the closing stages to win "comfortably" by eight lengths from Boatman.

=== 1999: three-year-old season ===
The colours of Daliapour's owner and breeder the Aga Khan

Gerald Mosse took over as Daliapour's jockey for his second season, which began with the Blue Riband Trial Stakes at Epsom Racecourse over ten furlongs on 21 April. Starting the odds-on favourite against four opponents he led from the start and steadily increased his advantage in the straight to win by two and a half lengths from Lightning Arrow. Seventeen days later the colt started odds on favourite against four opponents in the pertemps Derby Trial Stakes at Lingfield Park. After tracking the leader Entertainer, he took the lead early in the straight but was overtaken a furlong out and beaten one and a quarter lengths by Lucido with Royal Rebel and Fantastic Light finishing third and fourth.

On 5 June, Daliapour started at odds of 10/1 in a sixteen-runner field for the 220th running of The Derby. Daliapour was amongst the leaders from the start, turned into the straight in third place and took the lead approaching the last quarter mile. He was quickly challenged and overtaken by Oath and was beaten one and three quarter lengths into second, with the unplaced horses including Compton Admiral, Dubai Millennium and Val Royal. Later that month the colt started second favourite at odds of 4/1 for the Irish Derby at the Curragh. He took the lead in the straight but proved no match for the French-trained Montjeu and was beaten five lengths into second place. Daliapour was then matched against older horses for the first time in the King George VI & Queen Elizabeth Stakes at Ascot on 24 July. After leading in the early stages he dropped away quickly after half way and finished last of the eight runners behind Daylami. He sustained an injury in the race and did not race again in 1999.

=== 2000: four-year-old season ===
For the 2000 season, Daliapour was moved to the stable of Michael Stoute. He began his campaign in the Ormonde Stakes at Chester Racecourse on 11 May in which he was ridden by Kieren Fallon and started the 11/8 favourite. He took the lead approaching the final furlong and won "readily" by three quarters of a length from Life Is Life to give Sadler's Wells his 150th Group race winner in Europe. The Racing Post's Tony Morris described him as "An admirable racehorse, restored to fitness and form, who may well attain Group 1 glory this season". On 9 June he made his third appearance at Epsom when he started favourite for the Coronation Cup. His three opponents were Fantastic Light, Sagamix and Border Arrow (third in the 1998 Epsom Derby). With Fallon again in the saddle he led from the start, established a clear advantage three furlongs out and held off the late challenge of Fantastic Light to win by three quarters of a length. In July he made his second appearance in the King George VI & Queen Elizabeth Stakes and improved on his 1999 effort as he finished third behind Montjeu and Fantastic Light.

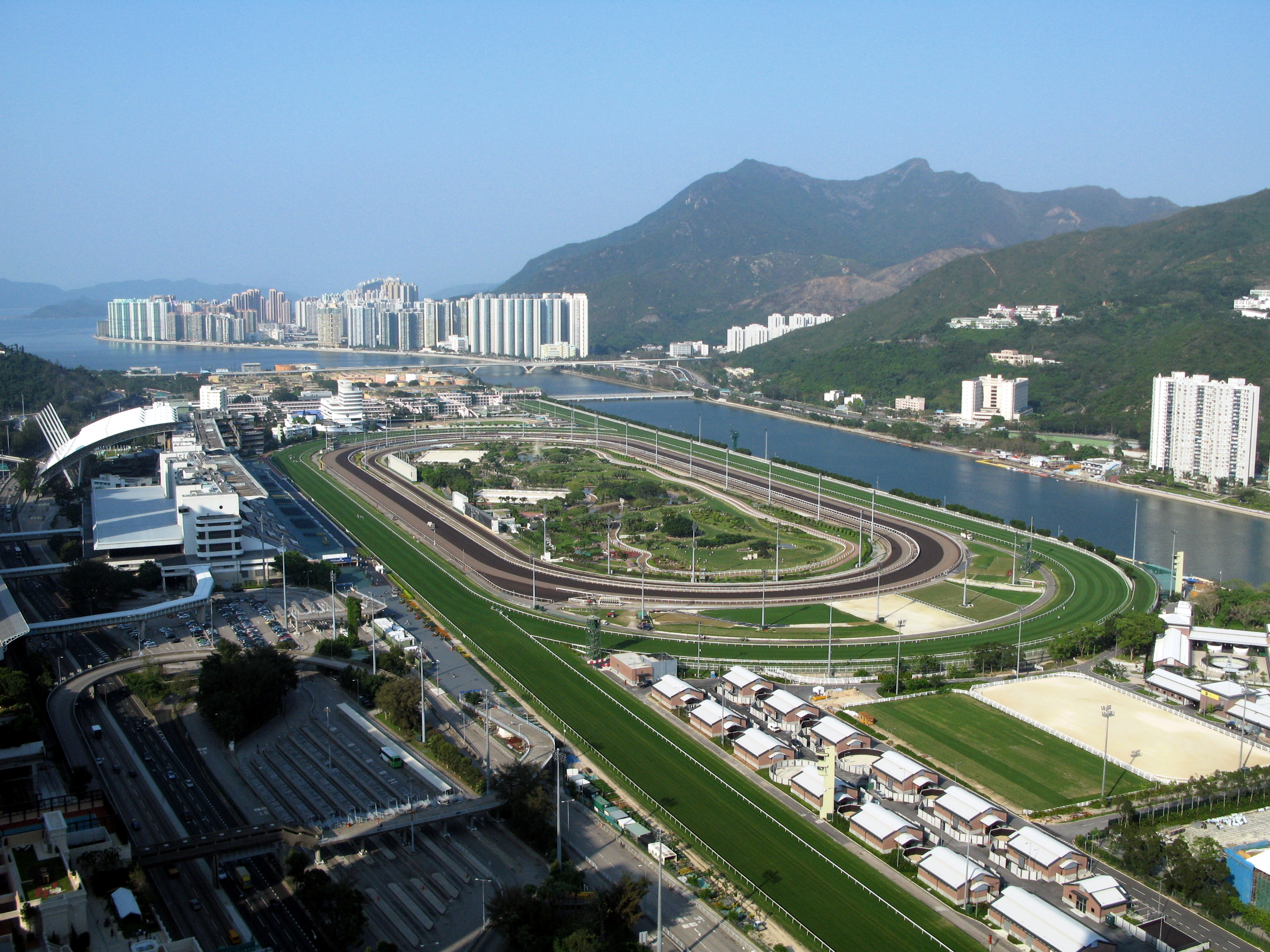
Sha Tin racecourse, where Daliapour won the 2000 Hong Kong Vase

In the second half of the season Daliapour embarked on an international campaign, starting with the Grosser Preis von Baden in September. Racing of very soft ground he started second favourite but finished fourth, almost eight lengths behind the German Derby winner Samum. In October he was sent to Canada for the Canadian International Stakes at Woodbine Racetrack and started 5/4 favourite against eleven opponents. He briefly took the lead in the last quarter mile but was outpaced in the closing stages and finished third behind Mutafaweq and Williams News. Daliapour was then acquired privately by Robert Ng for his Lucky Stable and was sent to Hong Kong to contest the Hong Kong Vase at Sha Tin Racecourse on 17 December. Ridden by Johnny Murtagh he started the 13/10 favourite ahead of his fellow British challenger Ela Athena (fourth in the Japan Cup), whilst the locally trained horses were headed by Indigenous, Idol and Helene Vitality. The United States was represented by Val's Prince (Turf Classic Invitational Stakes, Man o' War Stakes) while a strong German challenge comprised Catella (EHE Pokal), Caitano (Gran Premio del Jockey Club) and Silvano. Daliapour tracked the leaders and turned into the straight in second place behind Idol before taking the lead approaching the last 400 metres. He maintained his advantage to the line and won by one and three quarter lengths from Ela Athena with Caitano, Indigenous and Silvano close behind.

=== 2001: five-year-old season ===
Following his win in the Hong Kong Vase Daliapour remained in Hong Kong for the first half of 2001, being trained by Ivan Allan. The horse suffered from recurrent lameness and failed to win whilst based in Hong Kong: he finished unplaced behind Fairy King Prawn in 1000 metre sprint, fifth to Idol in the Hong Kong Gold Cup, seventh to Stay Gold when sent to the United Arab Emirates for the Dubai Sheema Classic and sixth to Silvano in the Queen Elizabeth II Cup. In June Allan recommended that Ng sent the horses back to Europe to rejoin Michael Stoute's stable. In an interview with the South China Morning Post he explained "I've said to Robert that he would be better off sending him to England to Sir Michael Stoute, who knows the horse well. His vet probably knows the lameness. I also think he's accustomed to the English style of training in wide-open spaces at Newmarket. He isn't really happy about being boxed up here".

On his first appearance after his return to Stoute's tutelage, Daliapour was sent to Woodbine to contest the Canadian International for a second time. Ridden by Murtagh, he finished fourth behind Mutamam in a rough race but was demoted to seventh for causing interference on the first turn. He was back at Sha Tin in December to defend the Hong Kong Vase but finished sixth of the fourteen runners behind Stay Gold.

=== 2002: six-year-old season ===
Daliapour remained in training with Stoute as a six-year-old and won one of his five races without recovering his best form. He began by finishing fourth in the Ormonde Stakes and was then moved up in distance for the Henry II Stakes over two miles at Sandown Park Racecourse and finished fifth behind Akbar. He was then sent to Ireland and dropped in class for the Group Three Curragh Cup on 29 June. Ridden by Mick Kinane he raced in second place being Murghem before taking the lead a furlong and a half from the finish and won "comfortably" by two lengths from the favoured Boreas, recording his first victory for eighteen months. On his return to England he contested the Geoffrey Freer Stakes at Newbury in August and finished fourth behind Mubtaker. Daliapour ended his racing career with a trip to Australia for the Melbourne Cup in which he started a 30/1 outsider. After leading in the early stages he remained among the leaders before dropping away in the last 600 metres and finishing sixteenth of the twenty-three runners behind Media Puzzle.

== Stud record ==
At the end of his racing career Daliapour was retired from racing to become a breeding stallion at the Haras des Chartreux in France. He sired several winners on the flat but nothing of top class and had more success as a sire of jumpers. He was exported to Australia in 2011 where he has based at the Rosemont Stud in Victoria. He was euthanized on 17 August 2015 after suffering from laminitis.

== Pedigree ==
Pedigree of Daliapour (IRE), bay stallion, 1996
Sire Sadler's Wells (USA) 1981	Northern Dancer (CAN); 1961	Nearctic	Nearco
Sire Sadler's Wells (USA) 1981	Northern Dancer (CAN); 1961	Nearctic	Lady Angela
Sire Sadler's Wells (USA) 1981	Northern Dancer (CAN); 1961	Natalma	Native Dancer
Sire Sadler's Wells (USA) 1981	Northern Dancer (CAN); 1961	Natalma	Almahmoud
Sire Sadler's Wells (USA) 1981	Fairy Bridge (USA); 1975	Bold Reason	Hail To Reason
Sire Sadler's Wells (USA) 1981	Fairy Bridge (USA); 1975	Bold Reason	Lalun
Sire Sadler's Wells (USA) 1981	Fairy Bridge (USA); 1975	Special	Forli
Sire Sadler's Wells (USA) 1981	Fairy Bridge (USA); 1975	Special	Thong
Dam Dalara (IRE) 1991	Doyoun (IRE); 1985	Mill Reef	Never Bend
Dam Dalara (IRE) 1991	Doyoun (IRE); 1985	Mill Reef	Milan Mill
Dam Dalara (IRE) 1991	Doyoun (IRE); 1985	Dumka	Kashmir
Dam Dalara (IRE) 1991	Doyoun (IRE); 1985	Dumka	Faizebad
Dam Dalara (IRE) 1991	Delsy (FR); 1972	Abdos	Arbar
Dam Dalara (IRE) 1991	Delsy (FR); 1972	Abdos	Pretty Lady
Dam Dalara (IRE) 1991	Delsy (FR); 1972	Kelty	Venture
Dam Dalara (IRE) 1991	Delsy (FR); 1972	Kelty	Marilla (Family: 13-c)
