= Reinhold Baer =

German mathematician (1902–1979)

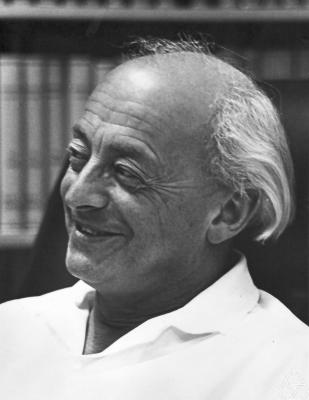
- Born: 22 July 1902; Berlin, Germany
- Died: 22 October 1979 (aged 77); Zürich, Switzerland
- Education: University of Göttingen
- Known for: Baer group Baer ring Baer–Suzuki theorem Baer–Specker group Injective module Ext functor
- Scientific career
- Fields: Mathematics
- Workplaces: University of Illinois at Urbana-Champaign; Goethe University Frankfurt
- Doctoral advisor: Hellmuth Kneser
- Doctoral students: Christine Ayoub; Grace Bates; Bernd Fischer; Otto H. Kegel

Reinhold Baer (22 July 1902 – 22 October 1979) was a German mathematician. He is most known for his work in algebra. He introduced the mathematical concept of injective modules in 1940. Baer rings, Baer groups, and Baer subplanes are all named, eponymously, for him.

== Biography ==
Reinhold Baer studied mechanical engineering for a year at Leibniz University Hannover, before he decided to study philosophy at Freiburg in 1921. While he was at Göttingen in 1922 he was influenced by Emmy Noether and Hellmuth Kneser. In 1924 he won a scholarship for specially gifted students. Baer wrote up his doctoral dissertation and it was published in Crelle's Journal in 1927.

Baer accepted a post at Halle in 1928. There, he published Ernst Steinitz's "Algebraische Theorie der Körper" with Helmut Hasse, first published in Crelle's Journal in 1910.

While Reinhold Baer was with his wife, Marianne, in Austria, Adolf Hitler and the Nazis came into power. Both of Baer's parents were Jewish; he was for this reason informed that his services at Halle were no longer required. Louis Mordell invited him to go to Manchester, and Baer accepted.

Baer stayed at Princeton University and was a visiting scholar at the nearby Institute for Advanced Study from 1935 to 1937. For a short while he lived in North Carolina. From 1938 to 1956 he worked at the University of Illinois at Urbana-Champaign. He returned to Germany in 1956.

According to biographer K. W. Gruenberg,

The rapid development of lattice theory in the mid-thirties suggested that projective geometry should be viewed as a special kind of lattice, the lattice of all subspaces of a vector space... [Linear Algebra and Projective Geometry (1952)] is an account of the representation of vector spaces over division rings, of projectivities by semi-linear transformations and of dualities by semi-bilinear forms.

Baer's most important work, however, was in group theory, including on the extension problem for groups, finiteness conditions, soluble and nilpotent groups.

He died of heart failure on 22 October, 1979, in Zürich, Switzerland.

In 2016 the Reinhold Baer Prize for the best Ph.D. thesis in group theory was set up in his honour.

== Bibliography ==
- 1934: "Erweiterung von Gruppen und ihren Isomorphismen", Mathematische Zeitschrift 38(1): 375–416 (German) doi:10.1007/BF01170643 MR 1545456
- 1940: "Nilpotent groups and their generalizations", Transactions of the American Mathematical Society 47: 393–434 MR 0002121
- 1944: "The higher commutator subgroups of a group", Bulletin of the American Mathematical Society 50: 143–160 MR 0009954
- 1945: "Representations of groups as quotient groups. II. Minimal central chains of a group", Transactions of the American Mathematical Society 58: 348–389 MR 0015107
- 1945: "Representations of groups as quotient groups. III. Invariants of classes of related representations", Transactions of the American Mathematical Society 58: 390–419 MR 0015108

== See also ==
- Capable group
- Dedekind group
- Retract (group theory)
- Radical of a ring
- Semiprime ring
- Nielsen–Schreier theorem
