= List of integrals of Gaussian functions =

In the expressions in this article,

$\varphi(x) = \frac{1}{\sqrt{2\pi}} e^{-\frac{1}{2} x^2}$

is the standard normal probability density function,

$\Phi(x) = \int_{-\infty}^x \varphi(t) \, dt = \frac{1}{2} \left[1 + \operatorname{erf}\left(\frac{x}{\sqrt{2}}\right)\right]$

is the corresponding cumulative distribution function (where erf is the error function), and

$T(h,a) = \varphi(h)\int_0^a \frac{\varphi(hx)}{1+x^2} \, dx$

is Owen's T function.

Owen has an extensive list of Gaussian-type integrals; only a subset is given below.

== Indefinite integrals ==
- $\int \varphi(x) \, dx = \Phi(x) + C$
- $\int x \varphi(x) \, dx = -\varphi(x) + C$
- $\int x^2 \varphi(x) \, dx = \Phi(x) - x\varphi(x) + C$
- $\int x^{2k+1} \varphi(x) \, dx = -\varphi(x) \sum_{j=0}^k \frac{(2k)!!}{(2j)!!}x^{2j} + C$
- $\int x^{2k+2} \varphi(x) \, dx = -\varphi(x)\sum_{j=0}^k\frac{(2k+1)!!}{(2j+1)!!}x^{2j+1} + (2k+1)!! \, \Phi(x) + C$

In the previous two integrals, n!! is the double factorial: for even n it is equal to the product of all even numbers from 2 to n, and for odd n it is the product of all odd numbers from 1 to n; additionally it is assumed that 0!! = (−1)!! = 1.

- $\int \varphi(x)^2 \, dx = \frac{1}{2\sqrt{\pi}} \Phi{\left(x\sqrt{2}\right)} + C$
- $\int \varphi(x)\varphi(a + bx) \, dx = \frac{1}{t} \varphi{\left(\frac{a}{t}\right)} \Phi{\left(tx + \frac{ab}{t}\right)} + C, \qquad t = \sqrt{1+b^2}$
- $\int x \varphi(a+bx) \, dx = -\frac{1}{b^2} \left[\varphi(a+bx) + a\Phi(a+bx)\right] + C$
- $\int x^2 \varphi(a+bx) \, dx = \frac{1}{b^3} \left[\left(a^2 + 1\right) \Phi(a+bx) + \left(a - bx\right) \varphi(a+bx) \right] + C$
- $\int \varphi(a+bx)^n \, dx = \frac{1}{b\sqrt{n{\left(2\pi\right)}^{n-1}}} \Phi{\left(\sqrt{n}(a+bx)\right)} + C$
- $\int \Phi(a+bx) \, dx = \frac{1}{b } \left[\left(a + bx\right) \Phi(a+bx) + \varphi(a+bx)\right] + C$
- $\int x \Phi(a+bx) \, dx = \frac{1}{2b^2} \left[\left(b^2 x^2 - a^2 - 1\right) \Phi(a+bx) + \left(bx - a\right) \varphi(a+bx)\right] + C$
- $\int x^2 \Phi(a+bx) \, dx = \frac{1}{3b^3} \left[\left(b^3 x^3 + a^3 + 3a\right) \Phi(a+bx) + \left(b^2 x^2 - abx + a^2 + 2\right) \varphi(a+bx)\right] + C$
- $\int x^n \Phi(x) \, dx = \frac{1}{n+1} \left[\left(x^{n+1} - nx^{n-1} \right)\Phi(x) + x^n\varphi(x) + n(n-1)\int x^{n-2}\Phi(x)\,dx \right] + C$
- $\int x\varphi(x)\Phi(a+bx) \, dx = \frac{b}{t} \varphi{\left(\frac{a}{t}\right)} \Phi{\left(xt + \frac{ab}{t}\right)} - \varphi(x) \Phi(a+bx) + C, \qquad t = \sqrt{1+b^2}$
- $\int \Phi(x)^2 \, dx = x \Phi(x)^2 + 2\Phi(x) \varphi(x) - \frac{1}{\sqrt{\pi}} \Phi{\left(x\sqrt{2}\right)} + C$
- $\int e^{cx}\varphi(bx)^n \, dx = \frac{e^{\frac{c^2}{2nb^2}}}{b\sqrt{n{\left(2\pi\right)}^{n-1}}} \Phi{\left(\frac{b^2xn-c }{b\sqrt{n}}\right)} + C, \qquad b\ne 0, n>0$

== Definite integrals ==
- $\int_{-\infty}^\infty x^2 \varphi(x)^n \, dx = \frac{1}{\sqrt{n^3{\left(2\pi\right)}^{n-1}}}$
- $\int_{-\infty}^\infty \varphi(x) \varphi(a+bx) \, dx = \frac{1}{\sqrt{1+b^2}} \varphi{\left(\frac{a}{\sqrt{1+b^2}}\right)}$
- $\int_{-\infty}^0 \varphi(ax) \Phi(bx) \, dx = \frac{1}{2\pi |a|} \left(\frac{\pi}{2} - \arctan\left(\frac{b}{|a|}\right)\right)$
- $\int_0^{\infty} \varphi(ax) \Phi(bx) \, dx = \frac{1}{2\pi |a|} \left(\frac{\pi}{2} + \arctan\left(\frac{b}{|a|}\right)\right)$
- $\int_0^\infty x \varphi(x) \Phi(bx) \, dx = \frac{1}{2\sqrt{2\pi}} \left( 1 + \frac{b}{\sqrt{1+b^2}} \right)$
- $\int_0^\infty x^2 \varphi(x) \Phi(bx) \, dx = \frac{1}{4} + \frac{1}{2\pi} \left(\frac{b}{1+b^2} + \arctan(b) \right)$
- $\int_{-\infty}^\infty x \varphi(x)^2 \Phi(x) \, dx = \frac{1}{4\pi\sqrt{3}}$
- $\int_0^\infty \Phi(bx)^2 \varphi(x) \, dx = \frac{1}{2\pi} \left( \arctan(b) + \arctan \sqrt{1+2b^2} \right)$
- $\int_{-\infty}^\infty \Phi(a+bx)^2 \varphi(x) \,dx = \Phi{\left( \frac{a}{\sqrt{1+b^2}} \right)} - 2 T{\left( \frac{a}{\sqrt{1+b^2}}, \frac{1}{\sqrt{1+2b^2}} \right)}$
- $\int_{-\infty}^{\infty} x \Phi(a+bx)^2 \varphi(x) \,dx = \frac{2b}{\sqrt{1+b^2}} \varphi{\left(\frac{a}{t}\right)} \Phi{\left(\frac{a}{\sqrt{1 + b^2} \sqrt{1 + 2b^2}}\right)}$
- $\int_{-\infty}^\infty \Phi(bx)^2 \varphi(x) \, dx = \frac{1}{\pi} \arctan \sqrt{1+2b^2}$
- $\int_{-\infty}^\infty x \varphi(x) \Phi(bx) \, dx = \int_{-\infty}^\infty x \varphi(x)\Phi(bx)^2 \, dx = \frac{b}{\sqrt{2\pi(1+b^2)}}$
- $\int_{-\infty}^\infty \Phi(a+bx) \varphi(x) \, dx = \Phi{\left(\frac{a}{\sqrt{1+b^2}}\right)}$
- $\int_{-\infty}^\infty x \Phi(a+bx) \varphi(x) \, dx = \frac{b}{\sqrt{1+b^2}} \varphi{\left(\frac{a}{\sqrt{1+b^2}}\right)},$
- $\int_0^\infty x \Phi(a+bx) \varphi(x) \, dx = \frac{b}{t} \varphi{\left(\frac{a}{t}\right)} \Phi{\left(-\frac{ab}{t}\right)} + \frac{1}{\sqrt{2\pi}}\Phi(a), \qquad t = \sqrt{1+b^2}$
- $\int_{-\infty}^\infty \ln(x^2) \frac{1}{\sigma} \varphi{\left(\frac{x}{\sigma}\right)} \, dx = \ln(\sigma^2) - \gamma - \ln 2 \approx \ln(\sigma^2) - 1.27036$
