= Capable group =

In mathematics, in the realm of group theory, a group is said to be capable if it is isomorphic to the quotient G / Z(G) of some group G by its center.

These groups were first studied by Reinhold Baer, who showed that a finite abelian group is capable if and only if it is a product of cyclic groups of orders n_{1}, ..., n_{k} where n_{i} divides n_{i +1} and n_{k −1} = n_{k}.

An equivalent condition for a group to be capable is if it occurs as the inner automorphism group of some group. To see this, note that the canonical surjective map $G \to \operatorname{Inn}(G)$ has kernel Z(G); by the first isomorphism theorem, G / Z(G) is equivalent to $\operatorname{Inn}(G)$.
