= Trapezoidal distribution =

Probability distribution

Trapezoidal
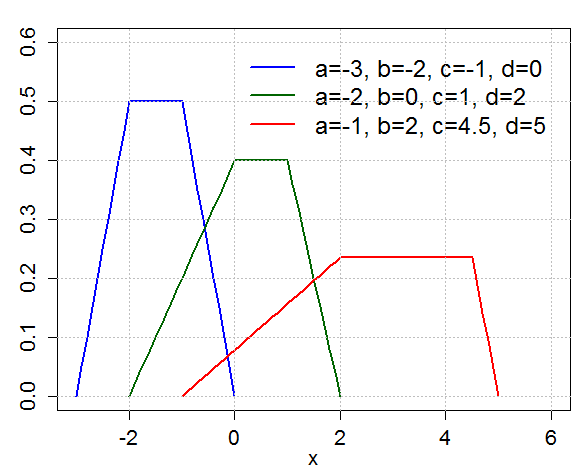
- Probability density function

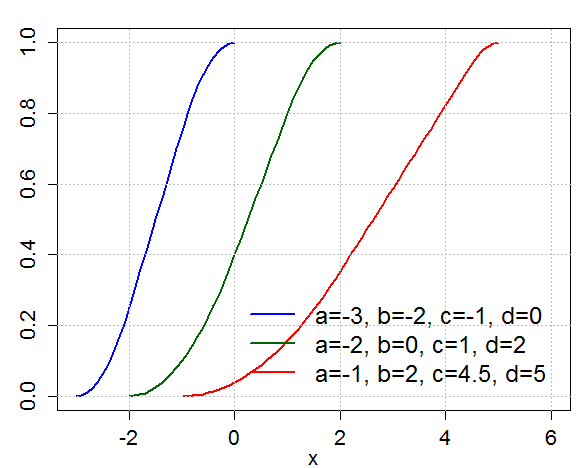
- Cumulative distribution function
- Parameters: $a \;(a<d)$ - lower bound; $b \;(a \le b < c)$ - level start; $c \;(b < c \le d)$ - level end; $d \;(c \le d)$ - upper bound
- Support: $x \in [a,d]$
- PDF: $$\frac{2}{d+c-a-b} \cdot \begin{cases} \frac{x-a}{b-a}  & \text{for } a\le x < b \\ 1  & \text{for } b\le x < c \\ \frac{d-x}{d-c}  & \text{for } c\le x \le d \end{cases}$$
- CDF: $$\begin{cases} \frac{1}{d+c-a-b}\frac{1}{b-a}(x-a)^2  & \text{for } a\le x < b \\ \frac{1}{d+c-a-b}(2x-a-b)  & \text{for } b\le x < c \\ 1 - \frac{1}{d+c-a-b}\frac{1}{d-c}(d-x)^2  & \text{for } c\le x \le d \end{cases}$$
- Mean: $\frac{1}{3(d+c-b-a)}\left(\frac{d^3-c^3}{d-c}-\frac{b^3-a^3}{b-a}\right)$
- Variance: $\frac{1}{6(d+c-b-a)}\left(\frac{d^4-c^4}{d-c}-\frac{b^4-a^4}{b-a}\right) - \mu^2$
- Entropy: $\frac{d-c+b-a}{2(d+c-b-a)}+\ln\left(\frac{d+c-b-a}{2}\right)$
- MGF: $\frac{2}{d+c-b-a}\frac{1}{t^2}\left(\frac{e^{dt} - e^{ct}}{d - c} - \frac{e^{bt} - e^{at}}{b - a}\right)$

In probability theory and statistics, the trapezoidal distribution is a continuous probability distribution whose probability density function graph resembles a trapezoid. Likewise, trapezoidal distributions also roughly resemble mesas or plateaus.

Each trapezoidal distribution has a lower bound a and an upper bound d, where a < d, beyond which no values or events on the distribution can occur (i.e. beyond which the probability is always zero). In addition, there are two sharp bending points (non-differentiable discontinuities) within the probability distribution, which we will call b and c, which occur between a and d, such that a ≤ b ≤ c ≤ d.

The image to the right shows a perfectly linear trapezoidal distribution. However, not all trapezoidal distributions are so precisely shaped. In the standard case, where the middle part of the trapezoid is completely flat, and the side ramps are perfectly linear, all of the values between c and d will occur with equal frequency, and therefore all such points will be modes (local frequency maxima) of the distribution. On the other hand, though, if the middle part of the trapezoid is not completely flat, or if one or both of the side ramps are not perfectly linear, then the trapezoidal distribution in question is a generalized trapezoidal distribution, and more complicated and context-dependent rules may apply. The side ramps of a trapezoidal distribution are not required to be symmetric in the general case, just as the sides of trapezoids in geometry are not required to be symmetric.

The non-central moments of the trapezoidal distribution are

$$\operatorname{E}[X^k] = \frac{2}{d+c-b-a}\frac{1}{(k+1)(k+2)}\left(\frac{d^{k+2} - c^{k+2}}{d - c} - \frac{b^{k+2} - a^{k+2}}{b - a}\right)$$

Special cases of the trapezoidal distribution include the uniform distribution (with a = b and c = d) and the triangular distribution (with b = c). Trapezoidal probability distributions seem to not be discussed very often in the literature. The uniform, triangular, Irwin-Hall, Bates, Poisson, normal, bimodal, and multimodal distributions are all more frequently discussed in the literature. This may be because these other (non-trapezoidal) distributions seem to occur more frequently in nature than the trapezoidal distribution does. The normal distribution in particular is especially common in nature, just as one would expect from the central limit theorem.

== See also ==
- Trapezoid
- Probability distribution
- Central limit theorem
- Uniform distribution (continuous)
- Triangular distribution
- Irwin–Hall distribution
- Bates distribution
- Normal distribution
- Multimodal distribution
- Poisson distribution
