= Baer group =

In mathematics, a Baer group is a group in which every cyclic subgroup is subnormal. Every Baer group is locally nilpotent.

Baer groups are named after Reinhold Baer.
