= Lucido =

Lucido is a given name and a surname.

Notable people with the given name include:

- Lucido Parocchi (1833–1903), Italian Roman Catholic cardinal

Notable people with the surname include:

- Jeremy Lucido (born 1977), American artist, blogger, photographer, zine publisher, and film director
- Lance Lucido (born 2007), Filipino actor and dancer
- Maria Silvia Lucido (1963–2008), Italian mathematician
- Peter Lucido (born 1960), American politician
