= Felix Leinen =

German professor, mathematician, and politician

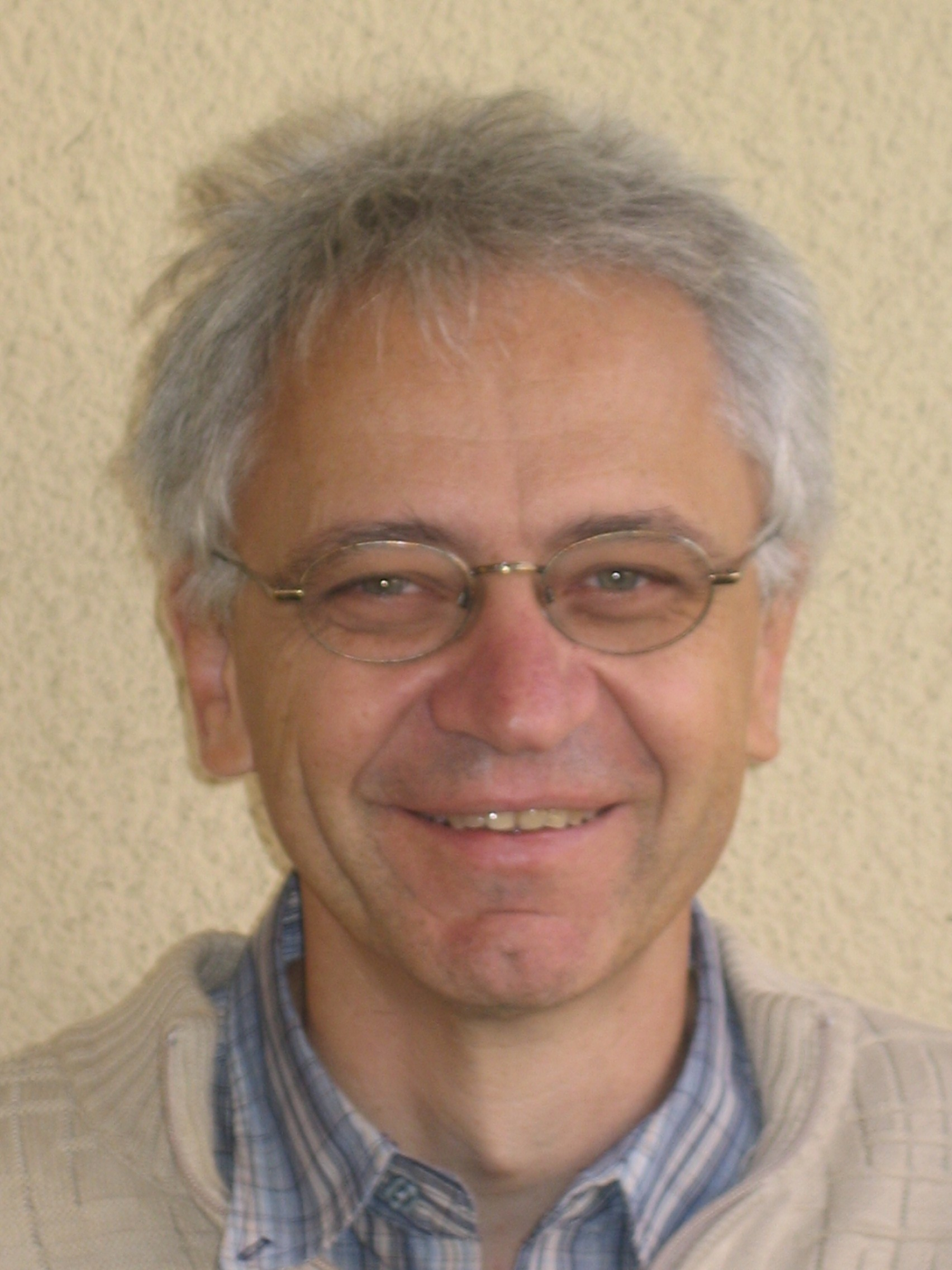

Personal details
- Born: 15 May 1957 (age 69) Wiesbaden, Hesse
- Party: Ecological Democratic Party (1999–present)
- Education: University of Freiburg
- Profession: Mathematician
- Website: (in German) Leinens website within JGU

Felix Leinen (born 15 May 1957) is a German professor, mathematician and politician of the Ecological Democratic Party (ÖDP.)

== Biography ==
Leinen studied mathematics from 1976 to 1982 at the University of Mainz. He obtained a PhD (Dr. rer. nat.) in 1984 at the University of Freiburg as a student of Otto H. Kegel. From 1984 to 1985 he worked as a Visiting assistant professor at Michigan State University, East Lansing. Since 1985 Leinen has worked at the University of Mainz. Since 1997 Leinen has been supernumerary professor at the Johannes Gutenberg-university. In the meantime, he made several professional visits to England, Italy and the USA. He volunteered in 1974–1984 supporting the Technisches Hilfswerk. Leinen is married and has four children.

== Political career ==
Since 1995 he has been active in a citizens' initiative that fights against the conversion of the Laubenheimer Höhe area in Mainz-Laubenheim into a quarry. In 1999 he joined the Ecological Democratic Party and served as the deputy national chairman from 2008 to 2010. He heads the Federal Education Policy Working Group of the ÖDP. Leinen is treasurer of his party in Rhineland-Palatinate and ÖDP-chairman of the local chapter of Mainz-Hechtsheim. In the local elections of 2009, he succeeded in gaining a seat on Mainz City Council. In October 2026, he was elected Treasurer of the Federal ÖDP.
