= Baer–Specker group =

Infinite abelian group that is not free abelian

In mathematics, in the field of group theory, the Baer–Specker group, or Specker group, named after Reinhold Baer and Ernst Specker, is an example of an infinite abelian group which is a building block in the structure theory of such groups.

== Definition ==
The Baer–Specker group is the group $B=\Z^{\N}$ of all integer sequences with componentwise addition, that is, the direct product of countably infinitely many copies of $\Z$. It can equivalently be described as the additive group of formal power series with integer coefficients.

== Properties ==
Reinhold Baer proved in 1937 that this group is not free abelian; Specker proved in 1950 that every countable subgroup of $B$ is free abelian.

The group of homomorphisms from the Baer–Specker group to a free abelian group of finite rank is a free abelian group of countable rank. This provides another proof that the group is not free. (Note: Blass and Göbel attribute this result to Specker. They write it in the form $P^*\cong S$ where $P$ denotes the Baer-Specker group, the star operator gives the dual group of homomorphisms to $\mathbb{Z}$, and $S$ is the free abelian group of countable rank. They continue, "It follows that $P$ has no direct summand isomorphic to $S$", from which an immediate consequence is that $P$ is not free abelian.)

== See also ==
- Slender group

== Notes ==
- Baer, Reinhold (1937). "Abelian groups without elements of finite order". Duke Mathematical Journal. 3 (1): 68–122. doi:10.1215/S0012-7094-37-00308-9. MR 1545974.
- Blass, Andreas; Göbel, Rüdiger (1996). "Subgroups of the Baer-Specker group with few endomorphisms but large dual". Fundamenta Mathematicae. 149 (1): 19–29. arXiv:math/9405206. doi:10.4064/fm-149-1-19-29. MR 1372355.
- Cornelius, E. F., Jr. (2009). "Endomorphisms and product bases of the Baer-Specker group". International Journal of Mathematics and Mathematical Sciences 396475. doi:10.1155/2009/396475.
- Griffith, Phillip A. (1970). Infinite Abelian Group Theory. Chicago Lectures in Mathematics. University of Chicago Press. pp. 111–112. ISBN 0-226-30870-7. Zbl 0204.35001.
- Specker, Ernst (1950). "Additive Gruppen von Folgen ganzer Zahlen". Portugaliae Mathematica (in German). 9: 131–140. MR 0039719.
