= Otto H. Kegel =

German mathematician (1934–2025)

Otto Helmut Kegel
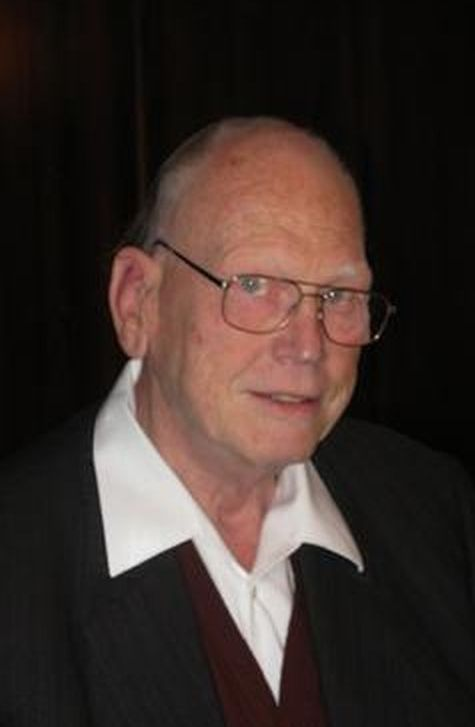
- Kegel in 2010
- Born: 20 July 1934; Bethlehem, Pennsylvania, U.S.
- Died: 20 July 2025 (aged 91)
- Education: Goethe University Frankfurt (PhD)
- Scientific career
- Fields: Mathematics
- Institutions: University of Freiburg
- Doctoral students: Felix Leinen

Otto Helmut Kegel (German: [ˈɔtoː ˈhɛlmuːt ˈkeːgəl]; 20 July 1934 – 20 July 2025) was a German mathematician who worked on group theory. He was a professor at the University of Freiburg.

== Early life and career ==
Kegel was born on 20 July 1934 in Bethlehem, Pennsylvania. His parents were German, and the family returned to Germany in 1938. He attended high school in Frankfurt am Main.

Kegel received his PhD from Goethe University Frankfurt in 1961, with a thesis titled Vertauschbarkeit von Untergruppen und Kompositionsstruktur in endlichen Gruppen (Commutability of subgroups and composition structure in finite groups) and supervised by Reinhold Baer. He completed his habilitation at the same institution in 1966.

In 1962, Kegel gave a talk titled Locally finite groups with a partition at the International Congress of Mathematicians, in Stockholm, Sweden.

Kegel started at Queen Mary College in the University of London as a reader in 1968, and was promoted to professor in 1970. He moved to the University of Freiburg beginning in 1975, where he worked as a professor until his retirement in 1999. He was an editor for Archiv der Mathematik from 1975 until 1990.

== Death ==
Kegel died on 20 July 2025, his 91st birthday.

== Research ==
Kegel worked in the field of group theory, a part of abstract algebra. His book on locally finite groups, written with Bertram Wehrfritz, was influential in the subfield. Prime graphs are also known as Gruenberg-Kegel graphs due to early unpublished work of Kegel with Karl W. Gruenberg on the topic.

== Awards and honors ==
In 1985, Archiv der Mathematik dedicated an issue to Kegel, in honor of his contributions to the journal as an author, editor, and on the advisory board. A conference Algebra and Group Theory was held in Kegel's honor at the University of Upper Alsace in 2015. The 2024 edition of the Ischia Group Theory conference was also dedicated to Kegel, marking his 90th birthday.

== Selected publications ==
- Kegel, Otto H. (1962). "Sylow-Gruppen und Subnormalteiler endlicher Gruppen". Mathematische Zeitschrift. 78: 205–221. doi:10.1007/BF01195169. MR 0147527. Zbl 0082.24703.
- Kegel, Otto H.; Wehrfritz, Bertram A. F. (1973). Locally finite groups. North-Holland Publishing Co. MR 0470081. Zbl 0259.20001.
