= Grace Bates =

American mathematician (1914–1996)

Grace Elizabeth Bates
- Born: August 13, 1914
- Died: November 19, 1996 (aged 82)
- Education: Mount Holyoke College
- Known for: Bates distribution
- Scientific career
- Fields: Mathematician
- Workplaces: Mount Holyoke College
- Doctoral advisor: Reinhold Baer

Grace Elizabeth Bates (13 August 1914 – 19 November 1996) was an American mathematician and one of few women in the United States to be granted a Ph.D. in mathematics in the 1940s. She became an emeritus professor at Mount Holyoke College. Bates specialized in algebra and probability theory, and she co-authored two textbooks: The Real Number System and Modern Algebra, Second Course. Throughout her own education, Bates overcame obstructions to her pursuit of knowledge, opening the way for future women learners.

== Early life and education ==
She was born on 13 August 1914. Interested in mathematics from a very young age, Bates was encouraged to pursue her interest by her family. Bates maintained a close relationship with her brother, reinforced by the early death of their mother. Upon completing high school, her brother used his salary to help her continue her education through high school and college.

During her studies, Bates petitioned several times to take more advanced math courses than were typically available to female students. She attended the Cazenovia Seminary for high school, where she petitioned to take intermediate algebra. She pursued her undergraduate studies at Middlebury College, which was segregated by sex at this time. For her senior year, Bates petitioned to take differential equations, which was only offered to male students. After completing her B.S. in mathematics in 1935, she continued in her studies to obtain a master's degree from Brown University in 1938.

Bates entered her doctoral program at the University of Illinois at Urbana-Champaign in 1944. Initially interested in geometry, Bates instead decided to pursue algebra and work under Reinhold Baer. She completed her doctoral thesis, titled "Free Loops and Nets and their Generalizations", in 1946.

== Professional life and continuing education ==
Bates taught briefly at Sweet Briar College before joining the faculty of Mount Holyoke College. After discussing her interest in probability and statistics with colleague Antoni Zygmund, Zygmund referred her to Jerzy Neyman at the University of California, Berkeley. Consequently, Bates obtained an assistantship at the Berkeley Statistical Laboratory and spend several summers working with Neyman in the 1950s. Together they wrote a number of research articles on probability theory.

Bates advanced to become a full and emeritus professor at Mount Holyoke College and taught until her retirement in 1979. She died on 19 November 1996.
