= Maria Silvia Lucido =

Italian mathematician (1963–2008)

Maria Silvia Lucido (22 April 1963 – 4 March 2008) was an Italian mathematician specializing in group theory, and a researcher in mathematics at the University of Udine.

== Life, education and career ==
Lucido was originally from Vicenza, where she was born on 22 April 1963. After working for a bank and a travel agency, she entered mathematical study at the University of Padua in 1986, graduating in 1991. Already as an undergraduate she began research into the theory of finite groups, and wrote an undergraduate thesis on the subject under the supervision of Franco Napolitani. She completed a Ph.D. at Padua in 1996 with the dissertation Il Prime Graph dei gruppi finiti [the prime graphs of finite groups], supervised by Napolitani and co-advised by Carlo Casolo.

After postdoctoral research at the University of Padua and as a Fulbright scholar at Michigan State University, she obtained a permanent position as a researcher at the University of Udine in 1999. She was killed in an automobile accident on March 4, 2008, survived by her husband and two sons.

== Research ==
Lucido was particularly known for her research on prime graphs of finite groups. These are undirected graphs that have a vertex for each prime factor of the order of a group, and that have an edge $pq$ whenever the given group has an element of order $pq$. Her work in this area included

- Proving that the connected components of these graphs have diameter at most five, and at most three for solvable groups.
- Proving that, when the prime graph is a tree, it has at most eight vertices, and at most four for solvable groups.
- Characterizing the finite simple groups for which all components of the prime graphs are cliques.

Lucido founded a series of annual summer schools on the theory of finite groups, held in Venice and sponsored by the University of Udine, beginning in 2004. After her death, the three subsequent offerings of the summer schools in 2010, 2011, and 2013 were dedicated in her honor.
