= Owen's T function =

In mathematics, Owen's T function T(h, a), named after statistician Donald Bruce Owen, is defined by

$$T(h,a)=\frac{1}{2\pi}\int_{0}^{a} \frac{e^{-\frac{1}{2} h^2 (1+x^2)}}{1+x^2}  dx \quad \left(-\infty < h, a < +\infty\right).$$

The function was first introduced by Owen in 1956.

== Applications ==
The function T(h, a) gives the probability of the event (X > h and 0 < Y < aX) where X and Y are independent standard normal random variables.

This function can be used to calculate bivariate normal distribution probabilities and, from there, in the calculation of multivariate normal distribution probabilities. It also frequently appears in various integrals involving Gaussian functions.

Computer algorithms for the accurate calculation of this function are available; quadrature having been employed since the 1970s.

== Properties ==
$$T(h,0) = 0$$
$$T(0,a) = \frac{1}{2\pi} \arctan(a)$$
$$T(-h,a) = T(h,a)$$
$$T(h,-a) = -T(h,a)$$
$$T(h,a) + T\left(ah,\frac{1}{a}\right) = \begin{cases} \frac{1}{2} \left(\Phi(h) + \Phi(ah)\right) - \Phi(h)\Phi(ah) &\text{if} \quad a \geq 0 \\  \frac{1}{2} \left(\Phi(h) + \Phi(ah)\right) - \Phi(h)\Phi(ah) - \frac{1}{2} & \text{if} \quad a < 0 \end{cases}$$
$$T(h, 1) = \frac{1}{2} \Phi(h) \left(1 - \Phi(h)\right)$$
$$\int T(0,x) \, \mathrm{d}x = x T(0,x) - \frac{1}{4 \pi} \ln\left(1+x^2\right) + C$$

Here Φ(x) is the standard normal cumulative distribution function

$$\Phi(x) = \frac{1}{\sqrt{2\pi}} \int_{-\infty}^x \exp\left(-\frac{t^2 }{2}\right) \, \mathrm{d}t$$

More properties can be found in the literature.

== Software ==
- Owen's T function (user web site) - offers C++, FORTRAN77, FORTRAN90, and MATLAB libraries released under the LGPL license LGPL
- Owen's T-function is implemented in Mathematica since version 8, as OwenT.
- Owen's T-function is also available as a function in R (https://search.r-project.org/CRAN/refmans/sn/html/T.Owen.html).
