= PERT distribution =

Family of probability distributions

PERT
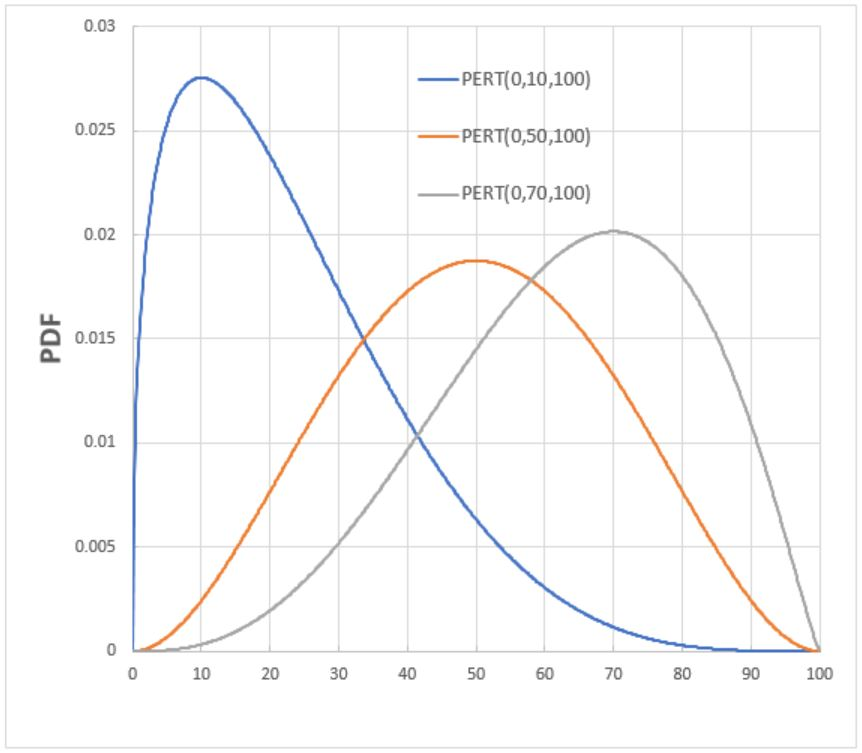
- Probability density function Example density curves for the PERT probability distribution

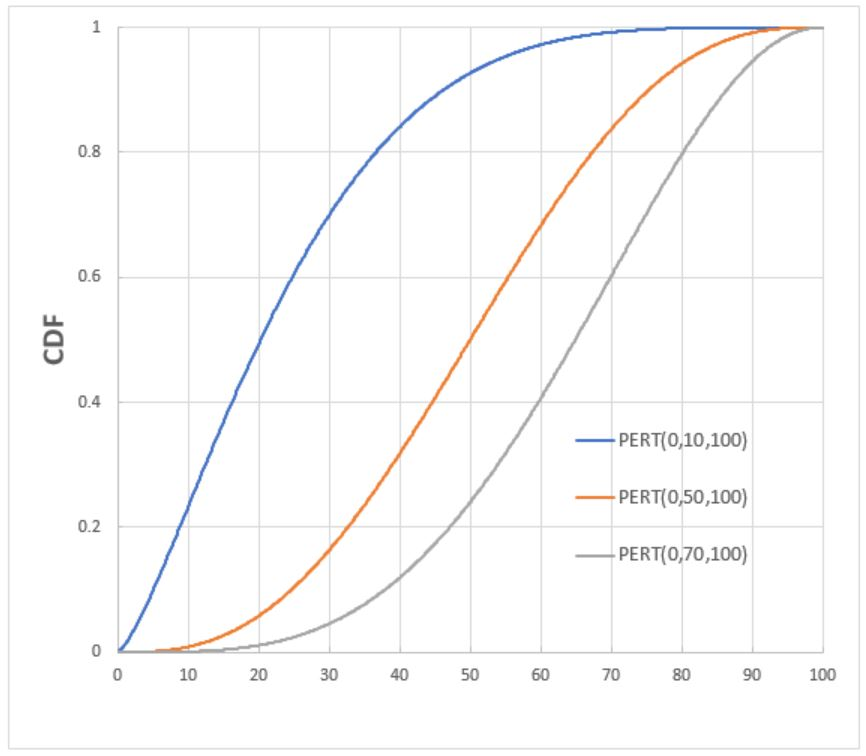
- Cumulative distribution function Example cumulative distribution curves for the PERT probability distribution
- Parameters: $b>a\,$ (real) $c>b\,$ (real)
- Support: $x \in [a,c]\,$
- PDF: $\frac{(x-a)^{\alpha-1}(c-x)^{\beta-1}} {\Beta(\alpha,\beta)(c-a)^{\alpha+\beta-1}}$ where $\alpha = \frac{4b+c-5a} {c-a} = 1 + 4 \frac{b-a}{c-a}$ $\beta = \frac{5c-a-4b} {c-a} = 1 + 4 \frac{c-b}{c-a}$
- CDF: $I_z(\alpha,\beta)$ (the regularized incomplete beta function) with $z = (x-a)/(c-a)$
- Mean: $\operatorname{E}[X] = \frac{a+4b+c}{6}=\mu$
- Median: $I_{\frac{1}{2}}^{[-1]}(\alpha,\beta)(c-a) + a$ $\approx a + (c-a) \frac{\alpha-1/3}{\alpha+\beta - 2/3} = \frac{a + 6 b + c}{8}$
- Mode: $b$
- Variance: $\operatorname{var}[X] = \frac{(\mu-a)(c-\mu)}{7}$
- Skewness: $\frac{2\,(\beta-\alpha)\sqrt{\alpha+\beta+1}}{(\alpha+\beta+2)\sqrt{\alpha\beta}}$
- Excess kurtosis: $\frac{6[(\alpha - \beta)^2 (\alpha +\beta + 1) - \alpha \beta (\alpha + \beta + 2)]}{\alpha \beta (\alpha + \beta + 2) (\alpha + \beta + 3)}$
- Entropy: $\ln(\Beta(\alpha,\beta)(c-a))-(\alpha-1)\psi(\alpha)-(\beta-1)\psi(\beta)+4\psi(6)$

In probability and statistics, the PERT distributions are a family of continuous probability distributions defined by the minimum (a), most likely (b) and maximum (c) values that a variable can take. It is a transformation of the four-parameter beta distribution with an additional assumption that its expected value is

$$\mu = \frac{a+4b+c} 6.$$

The mean of the distribution is therefore defined as the weighted average of the minimum, most likely and maximum values that the variable may take, with four times the weight applied to the most likely value. This assumption about the mean was first proposed in Clark, 1962 for estimating the effect of uncertainty of task durations on the outcome of a project schedule being evaluated using the program evaluation and review technique, hence its name. The mathematics of the distribution resulted from the authors' desire to make the standard deviation equal to about 1/6 of the range. The PERT distribution is widely used in risk analysis to represent the uncertainty of the value of some quantity where one is relying on subjective estimates, because the three parameters defining the distribution are intuitive to the estimator. The PERT distribution is featured in most simulation software tools.

== Comparison with the triangular distribution ==
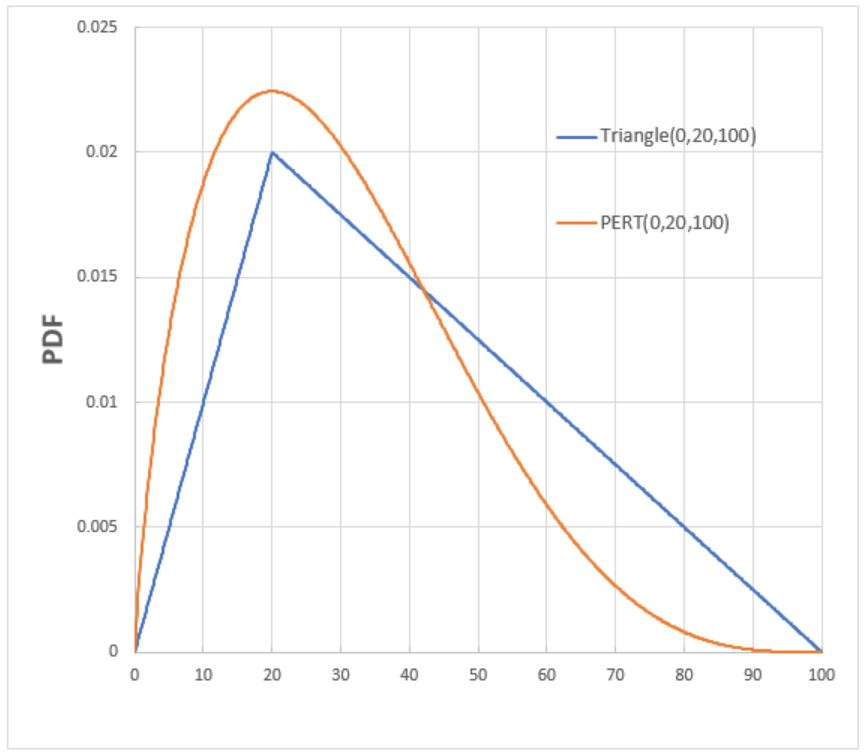
Comparing density curves for the PERT and triangular probability distributions

The PERT distribution offers an alternative to using the triangular distribution which takes the same three parameters. The PERT distribution has a smoother shape than the triangular distribution. The triangular distribution has a mean equal to the average of the three parameters:

$$\mu = \frac{a+b+c} 3$$

which (unlike PERT) places equal emphasis on the extreme values which are usually less-well known than the most likely value, and is therefore less reliable. The triangular distribution also has an angular shape that does not match the smoother shape that typifies subjective knowledge.

== The modified-PERT distribution ==
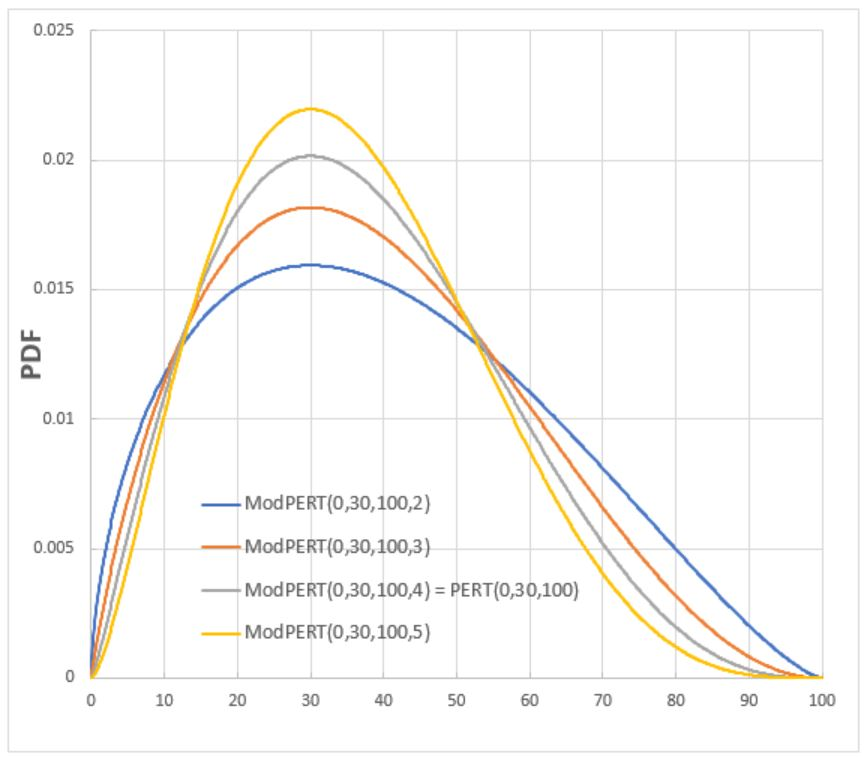
Comparing density curves for the modified PERT distributions with different weights

The PERT distribution assigns very small probability to extreme values, particularly to the extreme furthest away from the most likely value if the distribution is strongly skewed. The Modified PERT distribution was proposed to provide more control on how much probability is assigned to tail values of the distribution. The modified-PERT introduces a fourth parameter $\gamma,$ that controls the weight of the most likely value in the determination of the mean:

$$\mu = \frac{a+\gamma b+c}{\gamma+2}$$

Typically, values of between 2 and 3.5 are used for $\gamma,$ and have the effect of flattening the density curve; the unmodified PERT would use $\gamma=4$. This is useful for highly skewed distributions where the distances $(b-a),$ and $(c-b),$ are of very different sizes.

The modified-PERT distribution has been implemented in several simulation packages and programming languages:

- ModelRisk – risk analysis add-in for Excel.
- Primavera risk analysis – project risk analysis simulation tool.
- Tamara – project risk analysis simulation tool.
- Wolfram Mathematica – mathematical symbolic computation program.
- R (programming language): mc2d package.
- Python (programming language): pertdist package.
