= Slender group =

Mathematical term

In mathematics, a slender group is a torsion-free abelian group that is "small" in a sense that is made precise in the definition below.

== Definition ==
Let $\mathbb Z^{\mathbb{N}}$ denote the Baer–Specker group, that is, the group of all integer sequences, with termwise addition. For each natural number $n$, let $e_n$ be the sequence with $n$-th term equal to 1 and all other terms 0.

A torsion-free abelian group $G$ is said to be slender if every homomorphism from $\mathbb Z^{\mathbb{N}}$ into $G$ maps all but finitely many of the $e_n$ to the identity element.

== Examples ==
Every free abelian group is slender.

The additive group of rational numbers $\mathbb Q$ is not slender: any mapping of the $e_n$ into $\mathbb Q$ extends to a homomorphism from the free subgroup generated by the $e_n$, and as $\mathbb Q$ is injective this homomorphism extends over the whole of $\mathbb Z^{\mathbb{N}}$. Therefore, a slender group must be reduced.

Every countable reduced torsion-free abelian group is slender, so every proper subgroup of $\mathbb Q$ is slender.

== Properties ==
- A torsion-free abelian group is slender if and only if it is reduced and contains no copy of the Baer–Specker group and no copy of the $p$-adic integers for any $p$.
- Direct sums of slender groups are also slender.
- Subgroups of slender groups are slender.
- Every homomorphism from $\mathbb Z^{\mathbb{N}}$ into a slender group factors through $\mathbb Z^n$ for some natural number $n$.
