= Bates distribution =

Probability distribution

Bates
- Probability density function

- Cumulative distribution function
- Parameters: $-\infty < a < b < \infty$ $n \geq 1$ integer
- Support: $x \in [a,b]$
- PDF: see below
- Mean: $\tfrac{1}{2}(a+b)$
- Variance: $\tfrac{1}{12n}(b-a)^2$
- Skewness: 0
- Excess kurtosis: $-\tfrac{6}{5n}$
- CF: $\left(-\frac{in (e^{\tfrac{ibt}{n}}-e^{\tfrac{iat}{n}}) }{(b-a)t}\right)^n$

In probability and business statistics, the Bates distribution, named after Grace Bates, is a probability distribution of the mean of a number of statistically independent uniformly distributed random variables on the unit interval. This distribution is related to the uniform, the triangular, and the normal Gaussian distribution, and has applications in broadcast engineering for signal enhancement.

The Bates distribution on $[0,1]$ and of parameter $n$ is sometimes confused with the Irwin–Hall distribution of parameter $n$, which is the distribution of the sum (not the mean) of $n$ independent random variables uniformly distributed on the unit interval $[0,1]$. More precisely, if $X$ has a Bates distribution on $[0,1]$, then $nX$ has an Irwin-Hall distribution of parameter $n$ (and support on $[0,n]$). For $n=1$, both the Bates distribution and the Irwin-Hall distribution coincide with the uniform distribution on the unit interval $[0,1]$.

== Definition ==
The Bates distribution on the unit interval $[0,1]$ and with parameter $n \in \mathbb N$ is the continuous probability distribution of the empirical mean $X$ of $n$ independent random variables $U_1,...,U_n$ uniformly distributed on the unit interval:

$$X = \frac{1}{n}\sum_{k=1}^n U_k.$$

The probability density function is

$f_X(x; n)= \frac n {2(n-1)!} \sum_{k=0}^n (-1)^k {n \choose k} (nx-k)^{n-1} \sgn(nx-k)$

for $x$ in the open interval $]0,1[$, and zero elsewhere. Here $\sgn(nx-k)$ denotes the sign function:

$$\sgn(nx-k) = \begin{cases}
-1 &  nx < k \\
0 &  nx = k \\
1 &  nx > k. \end{cases}$$

More generally, the empirical mean $X^{(a,b)}$ of $n$ independent random variables $U_1^{(a,b)},...,U_n^{(a,b)}$ uniformly distributed on the interval $[a,b]$

$$X^{(a,b)} = \frac{1}{n}\sum_{k=1}^n U_k^{(a,b)}$$

has the following the probability density function (PDF) of

$$f_{X^{(a,b)}} (x; n) = \frac{1}{b-a} f_X\left(\frac{x-a}{b-a};n\right)$$

for $x \in ]a,b[$ and zero otherwise.

== Extensions and Applications ==
With a few modifications, the Bates distribution encompasses the uniform, the triangular, and, taking the limit as n goes to infinity, also the normal Gaussian distribution.

Replacing the term $\frac{1}{n}$ when calculating the mean, X, with $\frac{1}{\sqrt{n}}$ will create a similar distribution with a constant variance, such as unity. Then, by subtracting the mean, the resulting mean of the distribution will be set at zero. Thus the parameter n would become a purely shape-adjusting parameter. By also allowing n to be a non-integer, a highly flexible distribution can be created, for example, U(0,1) + 0.5U(0,1) gives a trapezoidal distribution.

The Student-t distribution provides a natural extension of the normal Gaussian distribution for modeling of long tail data. A Bates distribution that has been generalized as previously stated fulfills the same purpose for short tail data.

The Bates distribution has an application to beamforming and pattern synthesis in the field of electrical engineering. The distribution was found to increase the beamwidth of the main lobe, representing an increase in the signal of the radiation pattern in a single direction, while simultaneously reducing the usually undesirable sidelobe levels.

== See also ==
- Irwin–Hall distribution
- Normal distribution
- Central limit theorem
- Continuous uniform distribution
- Triangular distribution
