= Glossary of ring theory =

Ring theory is the branch of mathematics in which rings are studied: that is, structures supporting both an addition and a multiplication operation. This is a glossary of some terms of the subject.

For the items in commutative algebra (the theory of commutative rings), see Glossary of commutative algebra. For ring-theoretic concepts in the language of modules, see also Glossary of module theory.

For specific types of algebras, see also: Glossary of field theory and Glossary of Lie groups and Lie algebras. Since, currently, there is no glossary on not-necessarily-associative algebra structures in general, this glossary includes some concepts that do not need associativity; e.g., a derivation.

== A ==
Amitsur complex
The Amitsur complex of a ring homomorphism is a cochain complex that measures the extent in which the ring homomorphism fails to be faithfully flat.
Artinian
A left Artinian ring is a ring satisfying the descending chain condition for left ideals; a right Artinian ring is one satisfying the descending chain condition for right ideals. If a ring is both left and right Artinian, it is called Artinian. Artinian rings are Noetherian rings.
associate
In a commutative ring, an element a is called an associate of an element b if a divides b and b divides a.
automorphism
A ring automorphism is a ring isomorphism between the same ring; in other words, it is a unit element of the endomorphism ring of the ring that is multiplicative and preserves the multiplicative identity.
An algebra automorphism over a commutative ring R is an algebra isomorphism between the same algebra; it is a ring automorphism that is also R-linear.
Azumaya
An Azumaya algebra is a generalization of a central simple algebra to a non-field base ring.

== B ==
bidimension
The bidimension of an associative algebra A over a commutative ring R is the projective dimension of A as an (A^{op} ⊗_{R} A)-module. For example, an algebra has bidimension zero if and only if it is separable.
boolean
A boolean ring is a ring in which every element is multiplicatively idempotent.
Brauer
The Brauer group of a field is an abelian group consisting of all equivalence classes of central simple algebras over the field.

== C ==
category
The category of rings is a category where the objects are (all) the rings and where the morphisms are (all) the ring homomorphisms.
centre
1. An element r of a ring R is central if xr = rx for all x in R. The set of all central elements forms a subring of R, known as the centre of R.
2. A central algebra is an associative algebra over the centre.
3. A central simple algebra is a central algebra that is also a simple ring.
centralizer
1. The centralizer of a subset S of a ring is the subring of the ring consisting of the elements commuting with the elements of S. For example, the centralizer of the ring itself is the centre of the ring.
2. The double centralizer of a set is the centralizer of the centralizer of the set. Cf. double centralizer theorem.
characteristic
1. The characteristic of a ring is the smallest positive integer n satisfying nx = 0 for all elements x of the ring, if such an n exists. Otherwise, the characteristic is 0.
2. The characteristic subring of R is the smallest subring (i.e., the unique minimal subring). It is necessary the image of the unique ring homomorphism Z → R and thus is isomorphic to Z/n where n is the characteristic of R.
change
A change of rings is a functor (between appropriate categories) induced by a ring homomorphism.
Clifford algebra
A Clifford algebra is a certain associative algebra that is useful in geometry and physics.
coherent
A left coherent ring is a ring such that every finitely generated left ideal of it is a finitely presented module; in other words, it is coherent as a left module over itself.
commutative
1. A ring R is commutative if the multiplication is commutative, i.e. rs = sr for all r,s ∈ R.
2. A ring R is skew-commutative ring if xy = (−1)^{ε(x)ε(y)}yx, where ε(x) denotes the parity of an element x.
3. A commutative algebra is an associative algebra that is a commutative ring.
4. Commutative algebra is the theory of commutative rings.

== D ==
derivation
1. A derivation of a possibly-non-associative algebra A over a commutative ring R is an R-linear endomorphism that satisfies the Leibniz rule.
2. The derivation algebra of an algebra A is the subalgebra of the endomorphism algebra of A that consists of derivations.
differential
A differential algebra is an algebra together with a derivation.
direct
A direct product of a family of rings is a ring given by taking the cartesian product of the given rings and defining the algebraic operations component-wise.
divisor
1. In an integral domain R, an element a is called a divisor of the element b (and we say a divides b) if there exists an element x in R with ax = b.
2. An element r of R is a left zero divisor if there exists a nonzero element x in R such that rx = 0 and a right zero divisor or if there exists a nonzero element y in R such that yr = 0. An element r of R is a called a two-sided zero divisor if it is both a left zero divisor and a right zero divisor.
division
A division ring or skew field is a ring in which every nonzero element is a unit and 1 ≠ 0.
domain
A domain is a nonzero ring with no zero divisors except 0. For a historical reason, a commutative domain is called an integral domain.

== E ==
endomorphism
An endomorphism ring is a ring formed by the endomorphisms of an object with additive structure; the multiplication is taken to be function composition, while its addition is pointwise addition of the images.
enveloping algebra
The (universal) enveloping algebra E of a not-necessarily-associative algebra A is the associative algebra determined by A in some universal way. The best known example is the universal enveloping algebra of a Lie algebra.
extension
A ring E is a ring extension of a ring R if R is a subring of E.
exterior algebra
The exterior algebra of a vector space or a module V is the quotient of the tensor algebra of V by the ideal generated by elements of the form x ⊗ x.

== F ==
field
A field is a commutative division ring; i.e., a nonzero ring in which each nonzero element is invertible.
filtered ring
A filtered ring is a ring with a filtration.
finitely generated
1. A left ideal I is finitely generated if there exist finitely many elements a_{1}, ..., a_{n} such that I = Ra_{1} + ... + Ra_{n}. A right ideal I is finitely generated if there exist finitely many elements a_{1}, ..., a_{n} such that I = a_{1}R + ... + a_{n}R. A two-sided ideal I is finitely generated if there exist finitely many elements a_{1}, ..., a_{n} such that I = Ra_{1}R + ... + Ra_{n}R.
2. A finitely generated ring is a ring that is finitely generated as Z-algebra.
finitely presented
A finitely presented algebra over a commutative ring R is a (commutative) associative algebra that is a quotient of a polynomial ring over R in finitely many variables by a finitely generated ideal.
free
1. A free ideal ring or a fir is a ring in which every right ideal is a free module of fixed rank.
2. A semifir is a ring in which every finitely generated right ideal is a free module of fixed rank.
3. The free product of a family of associative is an associative algebra obtained, roughly, by the generators and the relations of the algebras in the family. The notion depends on which category of associative algebra is considered; for example, in the category of commutative rings, a free product is a tensor product.
4. A free ring is a ring that is a free algebra over the integers.

== G ==
graded
A graded ring is a ring together with a grading or a graduation; i.e., it is a direct sum of additive subgroups with the multiplication that respects the grading. For example, a polynomial ring is a graded ring by degrees of polynomials.
generate
An associative algebra A over a commutative ring R is said to be generated by a subset S of A if the smallest subalgebra containing S is A itself and S is said to be the generating set of A. If there is a finite generating set, A is said to be a finitely generated algebra.

== H ==
hereditary
A ring is left hereditary if its left ideals are all projective modules. Right hereditary rings are defined analogously.

== I ==
ideal
A left ideal I of R is an additive subgroup of R such that aI ⊆ I for all a ∈ R. A right ideal is a subgroup of R such that Ia ⊆ I for all a ∈ R. An ideal (sometimes called a two-sided ideal for emphasis) is a subgroup that is both a left ideal and a right ideal.
idempotent
An element r of a ring is idempotent if r^{2} = r.
integral domain
"integral domain" or "entire ring" is another name for a commutative domain; i.e., a nonzero commutative ring with no zero divisors except 0.
invariant
A ring R has invariant basis number if R^{m} isomorphic to R^{n} as R-modules implies m = n.
irreducible
An element x of an integral domain is irreducible if it is not a unit and for any elements a and b such that x = ab, either a or b is a unit. Note that every prime element is irreducible, but not necessarily vice versa.

== J ==
Jacobson
1. The Jacobson radical of a ring is the intersection of all maximal left ideals.
2. A Jacobson ring is a ring in which each prime ideal is an intersection of primitive ideals.

== K ==
kernel
The kernel of a ring homomorphism of a ring homomorphism f : R → S is the set of all elements x of R such that f(x) = 0. Every ideal is the kernel of a ring homomorphism and vice versa.
Köthe
Köthe's conjecture states that if a ring has a nonzero nil right ideal, then it has a nonzero nil ideal.

== L ==
local
1. A ring with a unique maximal left ideal is a local ring. These rings also have a unique maximal right ideal, and the left and the right unique maximal ideals coincide. Certain commutative rings can be embedded in local rings via localization at a prime ideal.
2. A localization of a ring : For commutative rings, a technique to turn a given set of elements of a ring into units. It is named Localization because it can be used to make any given ring into a local ring. To localize a ring R, take a multiplicatively closed subset S that contains no zero divisors, and formally define their multiplicative inverses, which are then added into R. Localization in noncommutative rings is more complicated, and has been in defined several different ways.

== M ==
minimal and maximal
1. A left ideal M of the ring R is a maximal left ideal (resp. minimal left ideal) if it is maximal (resp. minimal) among proper (resp. nonzero) left ideals. Maximal (resp. minimal) right ideals are defined similarly.
2. A maximal subring is a subring that is maximal among proper subrings. A "minimal subring" can be defined analogously; it is unique and is called the characteristic subring.
matrix
1. A matrix ring over a ring R is a ring whose elements are square matrices of fixed size with the entries in R. The matrix ring or the full matrix ring of matrices over R is the matrix ring consisting of all square matrices of fixed size with the entries in R. When the grammatical construction is not workable, the term "matrix ring" often refers to the "full" matrix ring when the context makes no confusion likely; for example, when one says a semsimple ring is a product of matrix rings of division rings, it is implicitly assumed that "matrix rings" refer to "full matrix rings". Every ring is (isomorphic to) the full matrix ring over itself.
2. The ring of generic matrices is the ring consisting of square matrices with entries in formal variables.
monoid
A monoid ring.
Morita
Two rings are said to be Morita equivalent if the category of modules over the one is equivalent to the category of modules over the other.

== N ==
nearring
A nearring is a structure that is a group under addition, a semigroup under multiplication, and whose multiplication distributes on the right over addition.
nil
1. A nil ideal is an ideal consisting of nilpotent elements.
2. The (Baer) upper nil radical is the sum of all nil ideals.
3. The (Baer) lower nil radical is the intersection of all prime ideals. For a commutative ring, the upper nil radical and the lower nil radical coincide.
nilpotent
1. An element r of R is nilpotent if there exists a positive integer n such that r^{n} = 0.
2. A nil ideal is an ideal whose elements are nilpotent elements.
3. A nilpotent ideal is an ideal whose power I^{k} is {0} for some positive integer k. Every nilpotent ideal is nil, but the converse is not true in general.
4. The nilradical of a commutative ring is the ideal that consists of all nilpotent elements of the ring. It is equal to the intersection of all the ring's prime ideals and is contained in, but in general not equal to, the ring's Jacobson radical.
Noetherian
A left Noetherian ring is a ring satisfying the ascending chain condition for left ideals. A right Noetherian is defined similarly and a ring that is both left and right Noetherian is Noetherian. A ring is left Noetherian if and only if all its left ideals are finitely generated; analogously for right Noetherian rings.
null
null ring: See rng of square zero.

== O ==
opposite
Given a ring R, its opposite ring R^{op} has the same underlying set as R, the addition operation is defined as in R, but the product of s and r in R^{op} is rs, while the product is sr in R.
order
An order of an algebra is (roughly) a subalgebra that is also a full lattice.
Ore
A left Ore domain is a (non-commutative) domain for which the set of non-zero elements satisfies the left Ore condition. A right Ore domain is defined similarly.

== P ==
perfect
A left perfect ring is one satisfying the descending chain condition on right principal ideals. They are also characterized as rings whose flat left modules are all projective modules. Right perfect rings are defined analogously. Artinian rings are perfect.
polynomial
1. A polynomial ring over a commutative ring R is a commutative ring consisting of all the polynomials in the specified variables with coefficients in R.
2. A skew polynomial ring

Given a ring R and an endomorphism σ ∈ End(R) of R. The skew polynomial ring R[x; σ] is defined to be the set {a_{n}x^{n} + a_{n−1}x^{n−1} + ... + a_{1}x + a_{0} | n ∈ N, a_{n}, a_{n−1}, ..., a_{1}, a_{0} ∈ R}, with addition defined as usual, and multiplication defined by the relation xa = σ(a)x ∀a ∈ R.

prime
1. An element x of an integral domain is a prime element if it is not zero and not a unit and whenever x divides a product ab, x divides a or x divides b.
2. An ideal P in a commutative ring R is prime if P ≠ R and if for all a and b in R with ab in P, we have a in P or b in P. Every maximal ideal in a commutative ring is prime.
3. An ideal P in a (not necessarily commutative) ring R is prime if P ≠ R and for all ideals A and B of R, AB ⊆ P implies A ⊆ P or B ⊆ P. This extends the definition for commutative rings.
4. prime ring : A nonzero ring R is called a prime ring if for any two elements a and b of R with aRb = 0, we have either a = 0 or b = 0. This is equivalent to saying that the zero ideal is a prime ideal (in the noncommutative sense.) Every simple ring and every domain is a prime ring.
primitive
1. A left primitive ring is a ring that has a faithful simple left R-module. Every simple ring is primitive. Primitive rings are prime.
2. An ideal I of a ring R is said to be primitive if R/I is primitive.
principal
A principal ideal : A principal left ideal in a ring R is a left ideal of the form Ra for some element a of R. A principal right ideal is a right ideal of the form aR for some element a of R. A principal ideal is a two-sided ideal of the form RaR for some element a of R.
principal
1. A principal ideal domain is an integral domain in which every ideal is principal.
2. A principal ideal ring is a ring in which every ideal is principal.

== Q ==
quasi-Frobenius
quasi-Frobenius ring : a special type of Artinian ring that is also a self-injective ring on both sides. Every semisimple ring is quasi-Frobenius.
quotient ring or factor ring : Given a ring R and an ideal I of R, the quotient ring is the ring formed by the set R/I of cosets {a + I : a ∈ R} together with the operations (a + I) + (b + I) = (a + b) + I and (a + I)(b + I) = ab + I. The relationship between ideals, homomorphisms, and factor rings is summed up in the fundamental theorem on homomorphisms.

== R ==
radical
The radical of an ideal I in a commutative ring consists of all those ring elements a power of which lies in I. It is equal to the intersection of all prime ideals containing I.
ring
1. A set R with two binary operations, usually called addition (+) and multiplication (×), such that R is an abelian group under addition, R is a monoid under multiplication, and multiplication is both left and right distributive over addition. Rings are assumed to have multiplicative identities unless otherwise noted. The additive identity is denoted by 0 and the multiplicative identity by 1. (Warning: some books, especially older books, use the term "ring" to mean what here will be called a rng; i.e., they do not require a ring to have a multiplicative identity.)
2. A ring homomorphism : A function f : R → S between rings (R, +, ∗) and (S, ⊕, ×) is a ring homomorphism if it satisfies

f(a + b) = f(a) ⊕ f(b)
f(a ∗ b) = f(a) × f(b)
f(1) = 1

for all elements a and b of R.

3. ring isomorphism : A ring homomorphism that is bijective is a ring isomorphism. The inverse of a ring isomorphism is also a ring isomorphism. Two rings are isomorphic if there exists a ring isomorphism between them. Isomorphic rings can be thought as essentially the same, only with different labels on the individual elements.
rng
1. A rng is a set R with two binary operations, usually called addition (+) and multiplication (×), such that (R, +) is an abelian group, (R, ×) is a semigroup, and multiplication is both left and right distributive over addition. A rng that has an identity element is a "ring".
2. A rng of square zero is a rng in which xy = 0 for all x and y.

== S ==
self-injective
A ring R is left self-injective if the module _{R}R is an injective module. While rings with unity are always projective as modules, they are not always injective as modules.
semiperfect
A semiperfect ring is a ring R such that, for the Jacobson radical J(R) of R, (1) R/J(R) is semisimple and (2) idempotents lift modulo J(R).
semiprimary
A semiprimary ring is a ring R such that, for the Jacobson radical J(R) of R, (1) R/J(R) is semisimple and (2) J(R) is a nilpotent ideal.
semiprime
1. A semiprime ring is a ring where the only nilpotent ideal is the trivial ideal {0}. A commutative ring is semiprime if and only if it is reduced.
2. An ideal I of a ring R is semiprime if for any ideal A of R, A^{n} ⊆ I implies A ⊆ I. Equivalently, I is semiprime if and only if R/I is a semiprime ring.
semiprimitive
A semiprimitive ring or Jacobson semisimple ring is a ring whose Jacobson radical is zero. Von Neumann regular rings and primitive rings are semiprimitive, however quasi-Frobenius rings and local rings are usually not semiprimitive.
semiring
A semiring : An algebraic structure satisfying the same properties as a ring, except that addition need only be an abelian monoid operation, rather than an abelian group operation. That is, elements in a semiring need not have additive inverses.
semisimple
A semisimple ring is an Artinian ring R that is a finite product of simple Artinian rings; in other words, it is a semisimple left R-module.
separable
A separable algebra is an associative algebra whose tensor-square admits a separability idempotent.
serial
A right serial ring is a ring that is a right serial module over itself.
Severi–Brauer
The Severi–Brauer variety is an algebraic variety associated to a given central simple algebra.
simple
1. A simple ring is a non-zero ring that only has trivial two-sided ideals (the zero ideal, the ring itself, and no more) is a simple ring.
2. A simple algebra is an associative algebra that is a simple ring.
singular submodule
The right (resp. left) R-module M has a singular submodule if it consists of elements whose annihilators are essential right (resp. left) ideals in R. In set notation it is usually denoted as Z(M) = {m ∈ M | ann(m) ⊆_{e} R}.
subring
A subring is a subset S of the ring (R, +, ×) that remains a ring when + and × are restricted to S and contains the multiplicative identity 1 of R.
symmetric algebra
1. The symmetric algebra of a vector space or a module V is the quotient of the tensor algebra of V by the ideal generated by elements of the form x ⊗ y − y ⊗ x.
2. The graded-symmetric algebra of a vector space or a module V is a variant of the symmetric algebra that is constructed by taking grading into account.
Sylvester domain
A Sylvester domain is a ring in which Sylvester's law of nullity holds.

== T ==
tensor
The tensor product algebra of associative algebras is the tensor product of the algebras as the modules with component multiplication
The tensor algebra of a vector space or a module V is the direct sum of all tensor powers V^{⊗n} with the multiplication given by tensor product.
trivial
1. A trivial ideal is either the zero or the unit ideal.
2. The trivial ring or zero ring is the ring consisting of a single element 0 = 1.

== U ==
unit
unit or invertible element : An element r of the ring R is a unit if there exists an element r^{−1} such that rr^{−1} = r^{−1}r = 1. This element r^{−1} is uniquely determined by r and is called the multiplicative inverse of r. The set of units forms a group under multiplication.
unity
The term "unity" is another name for the multiplicative identity.
unique
A unique factorization domain or factorial ring is an integral domain R in which every non-zero non-unit element can be written as a product of prime elements of R.
uniserial
A right uniserial ring is a ring that is a right uniserial module over itself. A commutative uniserial ring is also called a valuation ring.

== V ==
von Neumann regular element
1. von Neumann regular element : An element r of a ring R is von Neumann regular if there exists an element x of R such that r = rxr.
2. A von Neumann regular ring: A ring for which each element a can be expressed as a = axa for another element x in the ring. Semisimple rings are von Neumann regular.

== W ==
Wedderburn–Artin theorem
The Wedderburn–Artin theorem states that a semisimple ring is a finite product of (full) matrix rings over division rings.

== Z ==
zero
A zero ring: The ring consisting only of a single element 0 = 1, also called the trivial ring. Sometimes "zero ring" is used in an alternative sense to mean rng of square zero.

== See also ==
- Glossary of module theory
