= Shimshon Amitsur =

Israeli mathematician (1921–1994)

- שמשון עמיצור
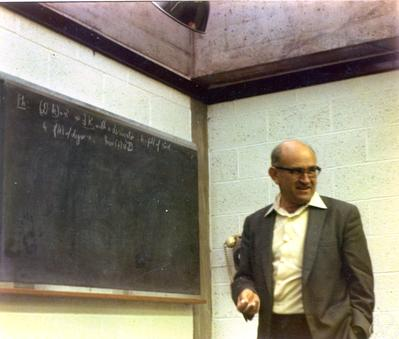
- Shimshon Amitsur, Leeds, 1972 (photo by George M. Bergman)
- Born: August 26, 1921; Jerusalem, British Mandatory Palestine
- Died: September 5, 1994 (aged 73); Jerusalem, Israel
- Education: Hebrew University of Jerusalem
- Known for: Amitsur–Levitzki theorem Amitsur complex Noncrossed product division algebras PI-ring theory General theory of radicals
- Awards: Israel Prize in Exact Sciences (1953); Honorary doctorate, Ben-Gurion University (1990); Honorary Member, London Mathematical Society (1989)
- Scientific career
- Fields: Mathematics
- Institutions: Hebrew University of Jerusalem
- Doctoral advisor: Jacob Levitzki
- Doctoral students: Avinoam Mann; Amitai Regev; Eliyahu Rips; Aner Shalev

Shimshon Avraham Amitsur (born Kaplan; Hebrew: שמשון אברהם עמיצור; August 26, 1921 – September 5, 1994) was an Israeli mathematician. A leading figure in twentieth-century noncommutative algebra, he is best known for his wide-ranging contributions to ring theory, including the theory of rings with polynomial identities (PI-rings), division algebras, the general theory of radicals, and the Amitsur complex in descent theory. His collected works, published in two volumes by the American Mathematical Society in 2001, are organized into four broad areas: general ring theory, structure theory of PI-rings, combinatorial PI-theory, and division algebras.

After the death of his advisor Jacob Levitzki in 1956, Amitsur became the leading algebraist in Israel and remained a dominant figure in the field until his death in 1994.

== Biography ==
=== Early life and education ===
Amitsur was born Shimshon Kaplan in Jerusalem, in what was then British-ruled Palestine. His family moved to Tel Aviv when he was a few years old, and he attended a commercial school there. The principal of his school, himself a mathematician who had authored mathematics textbooks, recognized the boy's exceptional ability. Since Amitsur's parents could not afford university tuition, the principal established a fund to finance his studies at the Hebrew University of Jerusalem.

Amitsur began his studies at the Hebrew University in 1938 under the supervision of Jacob Levitzki. His education was repeatedly interrupted by military service. He enlisted in the British Army during World War II, serving in the Jewish Brigade, and later served in the Israel Defense Forces during the 1948 Arab–Israeli War. Despite these interruptions, he continued to correspond with Levitzki on mathematical matters throughout his service. He received his M.Sc. degree in 1946 and his Ph.D. in 1950.

Amitsur changed his surname from Kaplan to the Hebrew name Amitsur around the time of Israeli independence in 1948. A paper he published in Hebrew in 1949 already bears the name Amitsur, though Levitzki's report on his doctoral thesis (1950) uses both names.

=== Career ===
Amitsur's doctoral thesis concerned division algebras and noncommutative polynomial rings; it was later recognized as containing ideas that were far ahead of their time. He spent nearly his entire career at the Hebrew University of Jerusalem, retiring in 1989 but remaining mathematically active until his death. He was a visiting scholar at the Institute for Advanced Study in Princeton from 1952 to 1954.

Amitsur was an Invited Speaker at the International Congress of Mathematicians in 1970 in Nice. He was a member of the Israel Academy of Sciences and Humanities, where he served as Head of the Exact Sciences Section. He was one of the founding editors of the Israel Journal of Mathematics and served as the mathematical editor of the Hebrew Encyclopedia.

Beyond research, Amitsur was influential in mathematics education in Israel, developing new approaches to mathematics teaching in high schools.

== Mathematical contributions ==
The editors of Amitsur's collected papers divide his work into four main areas: general ring theory, structure theory of PI-rings, combinatorial PI-theory, and the theory of division algebras.

=== General ring theory ===
Amitsur developed a comprehensive general theory of radicals in rings, published in a series of papers in the early 1950s. This work encompassed radicals in complete lattices, radicals in rings and bicategories, and the radicals of polynomial rings and related constructions. His results on algebras over uncountable set fields, ring of quotients and Morita equivalence, generic polynomial identities, and differential polynomials provided foundational tools for a generation of ring theorists.

=== Polynomial identity rings ===
In 1950, Amitsur and Jacob Levitzki proved the Amitsur–Levitzki theorem, which establishes the standard identity of degree 2n as a minimal polynomial identity satisfied by the ring of n×n matrices over a commutative ring. This result became a cornerstone of the theory of PI-rings and quickly gained widespread recognition; it earned both authors the inaugural Israel Prize in Exact Sciences in 1953.

Amitsur subsequently proved that every PI-algebra satisfies a power of the standard identity, and he established the primeness of the T-ideal of polynomial identities of matrix algebras. His work on the embedding of PI-rings into matrix rings over commutative rings, and his results on noncommutative algebras in the spirit of Hilbert's Nullstellensatz, extended the structural understanding of PI-rings from algebras over fields to arbitrary rings.

=== Combinatorial PI-theory ===
Amitsur made important contributions to the combinatorial aspects of PI-theory, including results on Capelli's identity, the construction of central polynomials for matrix algebras, and the study of sequences of codimensions and cocharacters of PI-algebras. His work on central polynomials simplified and sometimes extended various results in the structure theory of PI-algebras.

=== Division algebras and noncrossed products ===
Among Amitsur's most celebrated results is his 1972 proof of the existence of a division algebra that is not a crossed product. The question of whether every division algebra is a crossed product had been a major open problem in algebra for decades. Amitsur's construction used universal (generic) division algebras and resolved the problem in the negative, opening an entirely new direction of research in the theory of division algebras and the Brauer group. His method inspired subsequent constructions by David Saltman, Jacob–Wadsworth, and Eric Brussel, among others.

=== Amitsur complex ===
In a 1959 paper, Amitsur introduced a natural cochain complex associated to a ring homomorphism, now known as the Amitsur complex. When the homomorphism is faithfully flat, the Amitsur complex is exact, a fact that provides the algebraic foundation for the theory of faithfully flat descent. The construction has become a standard tool in commutative algebra and algebraic geometry, appearing in the study of descent, étale cohomology, and stacks.

== Awards and honours ==
- Israel Prize in Exact Sciences (1953), shared with Jacob Levitzki, in the prize's inaugural year
- Honorary Member of the London Mathematical Society (1989)
- Honorary doctorate from Ben-Gurion University (1990)

== Students ==
Amitsur's doctoral students include several mathematicians who went on to make major contributions of their own:

- Avinoam Mann
- Amitai Regev
- Eliyahu Rips
- Aner Shalev

== Legacy ==
An annual Amitsur Memorial Symposium has been held at the Hebrew University of Jerusalem since his death. In 2021, on the occasion of his centenary, the American Mathematical Society published a proceedings volume, Amitsur Centennial Symposium, documenting the broad ongoing impact of his work across group theory, algebraic groups, PI-algebras, quadratic forms, division algebras, Hopf algebras, and invariant theory.

== See also ==
- Amitsur–Levitzki theorem
- Amitsur complex
- PI ring
- Division algebra
- Crossed product
- Faithfully flat descent
- List of Israel Prize recipients

== Selected publications ==
- Amitsur, A. S.; Levitzki, Jakob (1950), "Minimal identities for algebras", Proceedings of the American Mathematical Society, 1 (4): 449–463, doi:10.1090/S0002-9939-1950-0036751-9, ISSN 0002-9939, JSTOR 2032312, MR 0036751
- Amitsur, S. A. (1952), "A general theory of radicals. I. Radicals in complete lattices", American Journal of Mathematics, 74: 774–786
- Amitsur, S. A. (1959), "Simple algebras and cohomology groups of arbitrary fields", Transactions of the American Mathematical Society, 90 (1): 73–112
- Amitsur, S. A. (1965), "Generalized polynomial identities and pivotal monomials", Transactions of the American Mathematical Society, 114: 210–226
- Amitsur, S. A. (1966), "Rational identities and applications to algebra and geometry", Journal of Algebra, 3: 304–359
- Amitsur, S. A. (1972), "On central division algebras", Israel Journal of Mathematics, 12 (4): 408–420
- Amitsur, S. A. (2001), Mann, Avinoam; Regev, Amitai; Rowen, Louis; Saltman, David J.; Small, Lance W. (eds.), Selected papers of S. A. Amitsur with commentary. Part 1, Providence, R.I.: American Mathematical Society, ISBN 978-0-8218-2924-0, MR 1866636
- Amitsur, S. A. (2001), Mann, Avinoam; Regev, Amitai; Rowen, Louis; Saltman, David J.; Small, Lance W. (eds.), Selected papers of S. A. Amitsur with commentary. Part 2, Providence, R.I.: American Mathematical Society, ISBN 978-0-8218-2925-7, MR 1866637
