= Regev =

Regev or Regeb (Hebrew: רגב) is a Jewish name that may refer to:

- Amitai Regev (born 1940), Israeli mathematician
- Aviv Regev (born 1971), Israeli computational biologist
- Eldad Regev (1980–2006), Israeli soldier
- Mark Regev (born 1960), Israeli diplomat
- Miri Regev (born 1965), Israeli politician and general
- Nir Regev (born 1977), Israeli inventor and founder of the #techtwin life improvement movement.
- Oded Regev (computer scientist) (born 1978), Israeli theoretical computer scientist and mathematician
- Oded Regev (physicist) (born 1946), physicist and astrophysicist
- Regev Fanan (born 1981), Israeli basketball player
- Uri Regev (born 1951), Israeli lawyer and rabbi

== See also ==
- Regev's theorem in algebra
