= Kurosh problem =

Mathematical problem

In mathematics, the Kurosh problem is one general problem, and several more special questions, in ring theory. The general problem is known to have a negative solution, since one of the special cases has been shown to have counterexamples. These matters were brought up by Aleksandr Gennadievich Kurosh as analogues of the Burnside problem in group theory.

Kurosh asked whether there can be a finitely-generated infinite-dimensional algebraic algebra (the problem being to show this cannot happen). A special case is whether or not every nil algebra is locally nilpotent. For PI-algebras the Kurosh problem has a positive solution.

Golod showed a counterexample to that case, as an application of the Golod–Shafarevich theorem.

The Kurosh problem on group algebras concerns the augmentation ideal I. If I is a nil ideal, is the group algebra locally nilpotent?

There is an important problem which is often referred as the Kurosh's problem on division rings. The problem asks whether there exists an algebraic (over the center) division ring which is not locally finite. As of September 2026, in a bulk release by OpenAI, a counterexample was posed to this problem. They construct a countable division ring of characteristic zero that is algebraic over its centre, which is generated by two elements as an algebra over that centre, and is infinite-dimensional over it. This still requires verification.
