= Radical of a ring =

Ideal ring structure

In ring theory, a branch of mathematics, a radical of a ring is an ideal containing the elements of the ring that are "not good" in some way.

The first example of a radical was the nilradical introduced by Köthe (1930), based on a suggestion of Wedderburn (1908). In the next few years several other radicals were discovered, of which the most important example is the Jacobson radical. The general theory of radicals was defined independently by (Amitsur 1952, 1954, 1954b) and Kurosh (1953).

The study of radicals is called torsion theory.

== Definitions ==
In the theory of radicals, rings are usually assumed to be associative, but need not be commutative and need not have a multiplicative identity. In particular, every ideal in a ring is also a ring.

Let $\mathfrak{A}$ be a class of rings which is:

1. closed under homomorphic images. That is, for all rings $A, B \in \mathfrak{A}$ and any ring homomorphism $f: A \rightarrow B$ (which may fail to preserve any left- or right-identities) then the image of $f$ is in $\mathfrak{A}$
2. closed under taking ideals (for all rings $A \in \mathfrak{A}$, and $I$ is an ideal on $A$, then $I \in \mathfrak{A}$).

In particular, $\mathfrak{A}$ could just be the class of all (non-unital) rings.

Let r be some abstract property of rings in $\mathfrak{A}$. A ring with property r is called an r-ring; an ideal of some ring with property r is called an r-ideal. In particular, the r-ideals are a subset of the r-rings. A ring $A$ is said to be a r-semi-simple ring if it has no non-zero r-ideals.

r is said to be a radical property if:

1. the class of r-rings is closed under homomorphic images
2. For every ring $A \in \mathfrak{A}$ there exists an associated r-ideal $r(A)$, which is maximal — $r(A)$ contains all the r-ideals of A. The ideal $r(A)$ is called the r- radical of the ring $A$.
3. $r( A / r(A) ) = 0$, which is true iff the quotient ring $A / r(A)$ is r-semi-simple.

Note that, for any r-ring $R$, $R$ is its own maximal r-ideal. One can say that $R$ is a radical, and the class of r-rings is the radical class. One can define a radical property by specifying a valid radical class as a subclass of $\mathfrak{A}$: for an ideal I of some arbitrary ring in $\mathfrak{A}$, I is an ''r''-ideal if it is isomorphic to some ring in the radical class.

For any class of rings $\delta \in \mathfrak{A}$, there is a smallest radical class $L \delta$ containing it, called the lower radical of $\delta$. The operator L is called the lower radical operator.

A class of rings is called regular if every non-zero ideal of a ring in the class has a non-zero image in the class. For every regular class δ of rings, there is a largest radical class Uδ, called the upper radical of δ, having zero intersection with δ. The operator U is called the upper radical operator.

A radical property r is said to be hereditary if for any ring $A \in \mathfrak{A}$ and any ideal $I$ of ring $A$, $r(I)=r(A) \cap I$. An equivalent condition on the radical class is that any ideal of a radical is also a radical.

The definition readily extends to defining the radical of an algebra. In particular, rings are algebras over the ring of integers.

== Examples ==
=== Jacobson radical ===
Let R be any ring, not necessarily commutative. The Jacobson radical of R is the intersection of the annihilators of all simple right R-modules.

There are several equivalent characterizations of the Jacobson radical, such as:

- J(R) is the intersection of the regular maximal right (or left) ideals of R.
- J(R) is the intersection of all the right (or left) primitive ideals of R.
- J(R) is the maximal right (or left) quasi-regular right (resp. left) ideal of R.

As with the nilradical, one can extend this definition to arbitrary two-sided ideals I by defining J(I) to be the preimage of J(R/I) under the projection map R → R/I.

If R is commutative, the Jacobson radical always contains the nilradical. If the ring R is a finitely generated Z-algebra, then the nilradical is equal to the Jacobson radical, and more generally: the radical of any ideal I will always be equal to the intersection of all the maximal ideals of R that contain I. This says that R is a Jacobson ring.

=== Baer radical ===
The Baer radical of a ring is the intersection of the prime ideals of the ring R. Equivalently it is the smallest semiprime ideal in R. The Baer radical is the lower radical of the class of nilpotent rings, and is also called the "lower nilradical" (and denoted Nil_{∗}R), the "prime radical", and the "Baer-McCoy radical". Every element of the Baer radical is nilpotent, so it is a nil ideal.

For commutative rings, this is just the nilradical and closely follows the definition of the radical of an ideal.

=== Upper nil radical or Köthe radical ===
The sum of the nil ideals of a ring R is the upper nilradical Nil^{*}R or Köthe radical and is the unique largest nil ideal of R. Köthe's conjecture asks whether any left nil ideal is in the nilradical.

=== Singular radical ===
An element of a (possibly non-commutative ring) is called left singular if it annihilates an essential left ideal, that is, r is left singular if Ir = 0 for some essential left ideal I. The set of left singular elements of a ring R is a two-sided ideal, called the left singular ideal, and is denoted $\mathcal{Z}(_R R)$. The ideal N of R such that $N/\mathcal{Z}(_R R)=\mathcal{Z}(_{R/\mathcal{Z}(_R R)} R/\mathcal{Z}(_R R))\,$ is denoted by $\mathcal{Z}_2(_R R)$ and is called the singular radical or the Goldie torsion of R. The singular radical contains the prime radical (the nilradical in the case of commutative rings) but may properly contain it, even in the commutative case. However, the singular radical of a Noetherian ring is always nilpotent.

=== Levitzki radical ===
The Levitzki radical is defined as the largest locally nilpotent ideal, analogous to the Hirsch–Plotkin radical in the theory of groups. If the ring is Noetherian, then the Levitzki radical is itself a nilpotent ideal, and so is the unique largest left, right, or two-sided nilpotent ideal.

=== Brown–McCoy radical ===
The Brown–McCoy radical (called the strong radical in the theory of Banach algebras) can be defined in any of the following ways:

- the intersection of the maximal two-sided ideals
- the intersection of all maximal modular ideals
- the upper radical of the class of all simple rings with multiplicative identity

The Brown–McCoy radical is studied in much greater generality than associative rings with 1.

=== von Neumann regular radical ===
A von Neumann regular ring is a ring A (possibly non-commutative without multiplicative identity) such that for every a there is some b with a = aba. The von Neumann regular rings form a radical class. It contains every matrix ring over a division algebra, but contains no nil rings.

=== Artinian radical ===
The Artinian radical is usually defined for two-sided Noetherian rings as the sum of all right ideals that are Artinian modules. The definition is left-right symmetric, and indeed produces a two-sided ideal of the ring. This radical is important in the study of Noetherian rings, as outlined by Chatters & Hajarnavis (1980).

== See also ==
Related uses of radical that are not radicals of rings:

- Radical of a module
- Kaplansky radical
- Radical of a bilinear form
