= Levitzky's theorem =

In mathematics, more specifically ring theory and the theory of nil ideals, Levitzky's theorem, named after Jacob Levitzki, states that in a right Noetherian ring, every nil one-sided ideal is necessarily nilpotent. Levitzky's theorem is one of the many results suggesting the veracity of the Köthe conjecture, and indeed provided a solution to one of Köthe's questions as described in (Levitzki 1945). The result was originally submitted in 1939 as (Levitzki 1950), and a particularly simple proof was given in (Utumi 1963).

== Proof ==
This is Utumi's argument as it appears in (Lam 2001, p. 164-165)

Lemma

Assume that R satisfies the ascending chain condition on annihilators of the form $\{r\in R\mid ar=0\}$ where a is in R. Then

1. Any nil one-sided ideal is contained in the lower nil radical Nil_{*}(R);
2. Every nonzero nil right ideal contains a nonzero nilpotent right ideal.
3. Every nonzero nil left ideal contains a nonzero nilpotent left ideal.

Levitzki's Theorem

Let R be a right Noetherian ring. Then every nil one-sided ideal of R is nilpotent. In this case, the upper and lower nilradicals are equal, and moreover this ideal is the largest nilpotent ideal among nilpotent right ideals and among nilpotent left ideals.

Proof: In view of the previous lemma, it is sufficient to show that the lower nilradical of R is nilpotent. Because R is right Noetherian, a maximal nilpotent ideal N exists. By maximality of N, the quotient ring R/N has no nonzero nilpotent ideals, so R/N is a semiprime ring. As a result, N contains the lower nilradical of R. Since the lower nilradical contains all nilpotent ideals, it also contains N, and so N is equal to the lower nilradical. Q.E.D.

== See also ==
- Nilpotent ideal
- Köthe conjecture
- Jacobson radical
