= Regev's theorem =

In abstract algebra, Regev's theorem, proved by Amitai Regev, states that the tensor product of two PI algebras is a PI algebra.
