= Nilpotent ideal =

In mathematics, more specifically ring theory, an ideal I of a ring R is said to be a nilpotent ideal if there exists a natural number k such that I^{k} = 0. By I^{k}, it is meant the additive subgroup generated by the set of all products of k elements in I. Therefore, I is nilpotent if and only if there is a natural number k such that the product of any k elements of I is 0.

The notion of a nilpotent ideal is much stronger than that of a nil ideal in many classes of rings. There are, however, instances when the two notions coincide—this is exemplified by Levitzky's theorem. The notion of a nilpotent ideal, although interesting in the case of commutative rings, is most interesting in the case of noncommutative rings.

== Relation to nil ideals ==
The notion of a nil ideal has a deep connection with that of a nilpotent ideal, and in some classes of rings, the two notions coincide. If an ideal is nilpotent, it is of course nil, but a nil ideal need not be nilpotent for more than one reason. The first is that there need not be a global upper bound on the exponent required to annihilate various elements of the nil ideal, and secondly, each element being nilpotent does not force products of distinct elements to vanish.

In a right Artinian ring, any nil ideal is nilpotent. This is proven by observing that any nil ideal is contained in the Jacobson radical of the ring, and since the Jacobson radical is a nilpotent ideal (due to the Artinian hypothesis), the result follows. In fact, this can be generalized to right Noetherian rings; this result is known as Levitzky's theorem.

== See also ==
- Köthe conjecture
- Nilpotent element
- Nilradical
- Jacobson radical
