= Aner Shalev =

Israeli mathematician and writer

- ענר שלו
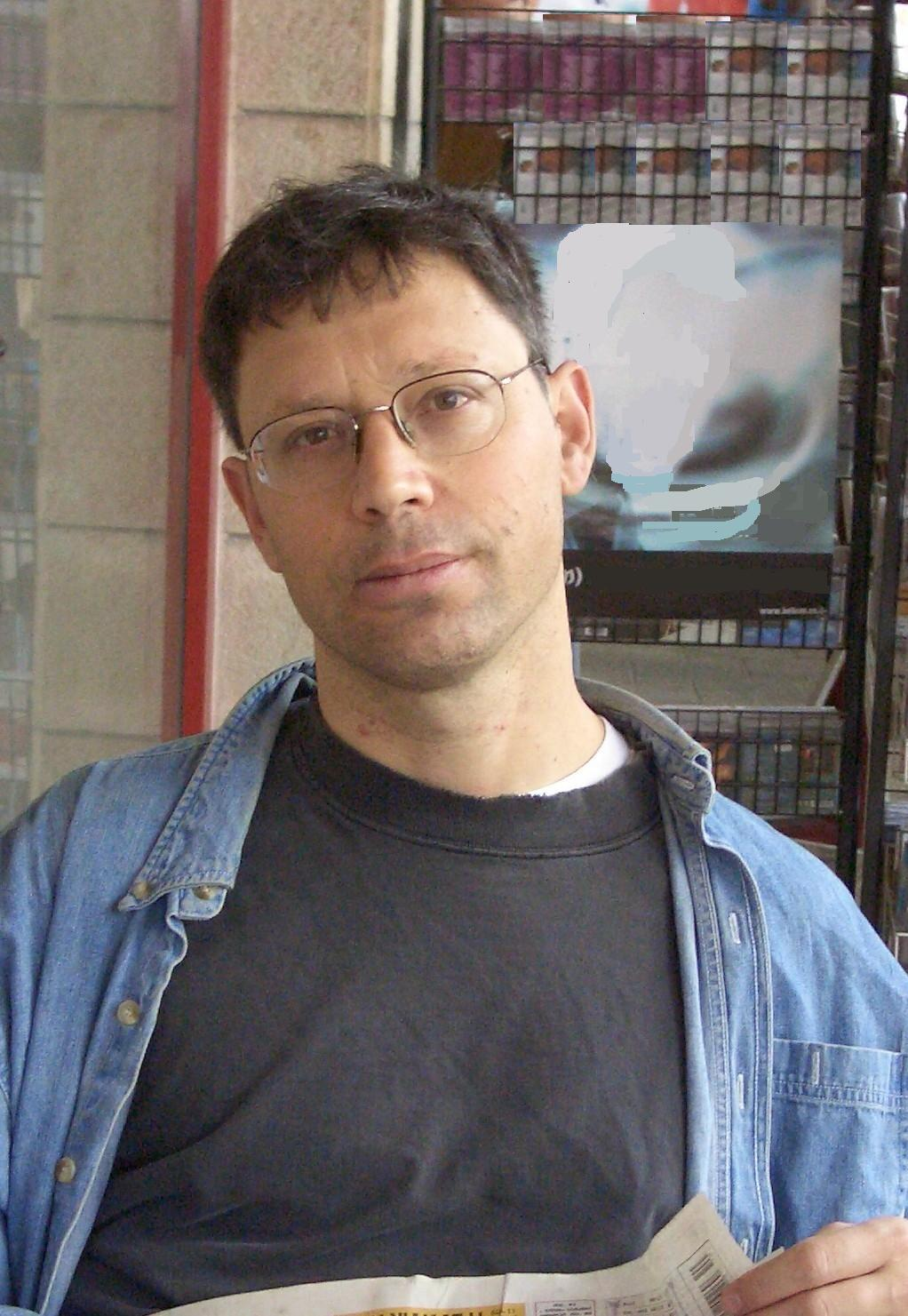
- Aner Shalev (2007)
- Born: January 24, 1958 (age 68); Kibbutz Kinneret, Israel
- Education: Hebrew University of Jerusalem
- Known for: Contributions to group theory, probabilistic methods in finite groups, solution of the Ore conjecture
- Scientific career
- Fields: Mathematics
- Workplaces: Hebrew University of Jerusalem
- Doctoral advisor: Shimshon Amitsur, Avinoam Mann

Aner Shalev (Hebrew: ענר שלו; born 24 January 1958) is a professor at the Einstein Institute of Mathematics at the Hebrew University of Jerusalem, and an author.

== Biography ==
Shalev was born in Kibbutz Kinneret and grew up in Beit Berl. He moved to Jerusalem at 18 to study mathematics and philosophy at the Hebrew University, and since then, excluding some years abroad, his primary residence has been in Jerusalem.

Shalev received his Ph.D. in mathematics at the Hebrew University in 1989, summa cum laude. His doctoral thesis was written under the supervision of Professors Amitsur and Mann and dealt with group rings, an area combining group theory and ring theory.

Shalev spent his post-doctoral period at Oxford University and at the University of London, returned to Israel in 1992, when he was hired as a senior lecturer at the Hebrew University. Shalev was appointed full professor in 1996, and spent sabbaticals at the Universities of Chicago, Oxford (All Souls College), and London (Imperial College). He was also a visiting scholar at other institutes, such as the Australian National University, MSRI Berkeley, the Institute for Advanced Studies at the Hebrew University, and the Institute for Advanced Study at Princeton.

Shalev is joint editor of the Israel Journal of Mathematics, the Journal of Group Theory, and the Journal of Algebra. He gave an invited talk at the International Congress of Mathematicians (ICM) in Berlin in 1998 and at numerous other mathematical conferences all over the world. Shalev was awarded many grants from various sources, including the ERC Advanced Grant from the European Community (2010–2014).

Aner Shalev is married to Donna Shalev, a senior lecturer at the Classics Department of the Hebrew University of Jerusalem, and they have two daughters.

His cousin is the author Meir Shalev, and he is the brother of author Zeruya Shalev.

== Research ==
Shalev's main area of research over the years has been group theory, and he often uses methods from other disciplines, such as Lie algebras and probability. He has also worked on ring theory, Lie algebras, and other areas. Shalev has published around 120 mathematical articles in various international journals.

The first fruits of Shalev's research solve various problems in group rings using a unified method based on dimension subgroups. Subsequently, he worked extensively in p-groups and pro-p groups and was among those who solved the coclass conjectures on the structure of such groups. Likewise Shalev used Lie methods to solve problems on fixed points of automorphisms of p-groups, and studied subgroup growth of profinite and discrete groups.

== Probabilistic methods in group theory ==
From 1995 Shalev developed and applied probabilistic methods to finite groups and (nonabelian) finite simple groups in particular. A formative result in this area shows that almost every pair of elements in a finite simple group generate the group. This result, like many others in the field, was proved by Shalev in collaboration with Martin Liebeck of Imperial College at the University of London. The probabilistic approach led to the solution of many classical problems whose formulation does not involve probability; these problems concern quotients of the modular group, conjectures of Babai and of Cameron on permutation groups, diameters of certain Cayley graphs, Fuchsian groups, random walks, etc.

== Current research ==
Shalev (partly with Michael J. Larsen) has been researching the behavior of word maps on groups, proving Waring type theorems; he also proved, together with Liebeck, O'Brien and Tiep, the Ore conjecture from 1951, according to which every element in a non-cyclic finite simple group is a commutator.

== Selected papers ==
- Shalev, Aner (1994). "The structure of finite p-groups: Effective proof of the coclass conjectures". Inventiones Mathematicae. 115: 315–345. Bibcode:1994InMat.115..315S. doi:10.1007/BF01231763. S2CID 122256486.
- Liebeck, Martin W; Shalev, Aner (1996). "Classical Groups, Probabilistic Methods, and the (2, 3)-Generation Problem". Annals of Mathematics. 144 (1): 77–125. doi:10.2307/2118584. JSTOR 2118584.
- Liebeck, Martin W; Shalev, Aner (2001). "Diameters of Finite Simple Groups: Sharp Bounds and Applications". Annals of Mathematics. 154 (2): 383–406. doi:10.2307/3062101. JSTOR 3062101.
- Shalev, A. (April 2001). "Asymptotic Group Theory" (PDF). Notices of the American Mathematical Society. 48: 383–389.
- Liebeck, Martin W.; Shalev, Aner (2005). "Fuchsian groups, finite simple groups, and representation varieties" (PDF). Inventiones Mathematicae. 159 (2): 317–376. doi:10.1007/s00222-004-0390-3. hdl:10044/1/88. S2CID 53970968. Archived from the original (PDF) on 2013-05-13.
- Larsen, M.; Shalev, A. (2008). "Characters of symmetric groups: sharp bounds and applications" (PDF). Inventiones Mathematicae. 174 (3): 645–687. Bibcode:2008InMat.174..645L. doi:10.1007/s00222-008-0145-7. S2CID 10763896. Archived from the original (PDF) on 2012-07-16.
- Larsen, M.; Shalev, A. (2009). "Word maps and Waring type problems" (PDF). Journal of the American Mathematical Society. 22 (2): 437–466. Bibcode:2009JAMS...22..437L. doi:10.1090/s0894-0347-08-00615-2.
- Shalev, A. (2009). "Word maps, conjugacy classes, and a non-commutative Waring-type theorem". Annals of Mathematics. 170 (3): 1383–1416. doi:10.4007/annals.2009.170.1383. MR 2600876. Zbl 1203.20013.

== Literary work ==
=== Shalev's approach to writing ===
Shalev's approach to writing emphasizes language and structure. In all his literary writing he has included formal experimentation.

=== Opus 1 ===
This is Shalev's first literary work which was published in 1988 in the 'Library' series at the Keter publishing house, and edited by the literary scholar and critic Yig'al Schwartz. The manuscript of this book was awarded the Harry Harishon Prize under the auspices of the Hebrew University, in 1986. This is a collection of four stories with a musical superstructure in which Shalev attempts to apply musical terms and concepts to language and to emotions. The book is composed of two major parts: the first part, "Legato", is characterized by a flowing mode, long sentences without much punctuation and psychologically conveys a state of openness, whereas the second part, "Staccato", is characterized by short sentences, copious punctuation and an introspective, closed mood.

The first of the four stories, 'Opus 1', describes a boy who falls in love with his piano teacher. The second story, 'Concussion', portrays a relationship between two young people, and opens with an injury, providing the characters with a new perspective. The third story, 'Scherzo', deals with the journey to New York of an eccentric harpsichord player. The fourth story, 'Absence', describes the release from the army on psychiatric grounds of an AWOL interested in being the object of a search party. This story is formally structured as a crossword puzzle with two coordinates and has been described as 'a crossword riddled with contradictions demanding solutions'.

=== Overtures ===
Shalev's second book was published in 1996 in the 'New Library' series (Siman Kri'a – ha-Kibbutz ha-Me'uhad) edited by Menachem Peri. The book is composed of seventy openings of stories. The book bears a major element of fragmentation and gaps, and treats openings, or overtures, in the widest sense of the term; at times the stories have an opening and no ending; at others there is only a middle part and the beginning and ending are missing. On the one hand Shalev creates an intense mode of writing, featuring a video-clip nature, and on the other hand he seduces the readers toward filling in the gaps by themselves. Large parts of the book describe many places in the world where people arrive for short, breathless periods and are constantly on the go.

=== Dark Matter ===
Shalev's third book is a novel that was published in 2004 at the Zmora Bitan publishing house. It has appeared in German (2007), Italian (2007) and Czech (2009). The book describes a love triangle between a man and two women. Shalev was influenced in this book by the modern astrophysical theory of Dark Matter and Dark Energy; he applies these ideas to relationships between women and men. Alongside physical attraction between men and women, Shalev describes forces of repulsion, which overwhelmingly overcome the forces of attraction. This is an attempt to understand why many love stories which begin so well end so badly. The protagonist of the book is a married Israeli diplomat in New York who, during a visit to Israel, falls in love with a woman doing a doctorate in Physics on Dark Matter. The text is formally divided between emails sent by the woman to the man in the period before their tryst in New York, and descriptions from the man's perspective of that tryst. As the plot progresses the emails asymptotically approach in time the meeting in New York and illuminate its background, but these two types of text and narrative never coalesce.
