= Free ideal ring =

In mathematics, especially in the field of ring theory, a (right) free ideal ring, or fir, is a ring in which all right ideals are free modules with unique rank. A ring such that all right ideals with at most n generators are free and have unique rank is called an n-fir. A semifir is a ring in which all finitely generated right ideals are free modules of unique rank. (Thus, a ring is semifir if it is n-fir for all n ≥ 0.) The semifir property is left-right symmetric, but the fir property is not.

== Properties and examples ==
It turns out that a left and right fir is a domain. Furthermore, a commutative fir is precisely a principal ideal domain, while a commutative semifir is precisely a Bézout domain. These last facts are not generally true for noncommutative rings, however (Cohn 1971).

Every principal right ideal domain R is a right fir, since every nonzero principal right ideal of a domain is isomorphic to R. In the same way, a right Bézout domain is a semifir.

Since all right ideals of a right fir are free, they are projective. So, any right fir is a right hereditary ring, and likewise a right semifir is a right semihereditary ring. Because projective modules over local rings are free, and because local rings have invariant basis number, it follows that a local, right hereditary ring is a right fir, and a local, right semihereditary ring is a right semifir.

Unlike a principal right ideal domain, a right fir is not necessarily right Noetherian, however in the commutative case, R is a Dedekind domain since it is a hereditary domain, and so is necessarily Noetherian.

Another important and motivating example of a free ideal ring are the free associative (unital) k-algebras for division rings k, also called non-commutative polynomial rings (Cohn 2000, §5.4).

Semifirs have invariant basis number and every semifir is a Sylvester domain.
