= Kurt Hirsch =

German mathematician (1906–1986)

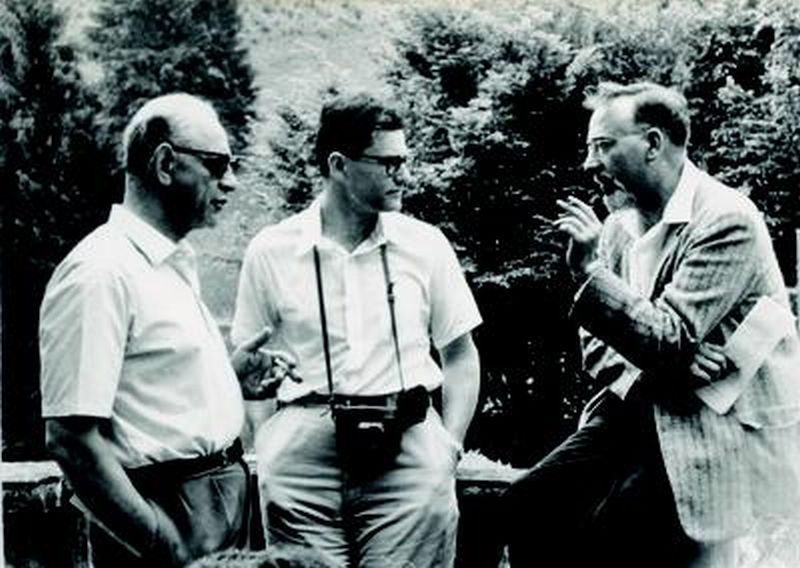
Hirsch (left) with Karl W. Gruenberg (center) and R. H. Bruck

Kurt August Hirsch (12 January 1906 – 4 November 1986) was a German mathematician who moved to England to escape the Nazi persecution of Jews. His research was in group theory. He also worked to reform mathematics education and became a county chess champion. The Hirsch length and Hirsch–Plotkin radical are named after him.

Hirsch trained initially at the University of Berlin. In 1934 he fled Nazi Germany and arrived in Cambridge, where with the encouragement of Philip Hall he enrolled as a doctoral student at King's College, Cambridge, receiving his PhD on Infinite Soluble Groups in 1937. He then taught at the University of Leicester from 1938 (except for a brief internment on the Isle of Man as an enemy alien in 1940), moved to King's College, Newcastle in 1948, and then moved again to Queen Mary College in London in 1951, where he stayed for the remainder of his career and worked with K. W. Gruenberg.

Hirsch's doctoral students include Ismail Mohamed and Ascher Wagner.

== Publications ==
He translated several books from Russian, including:

- The Theory of Groups (by Aleksandr Kurosh). His first translation
- Algebraic Geometry (by Shafarevich). This was later retranslated by Miles Reid
