= Jennifer Key =

South African mathematician

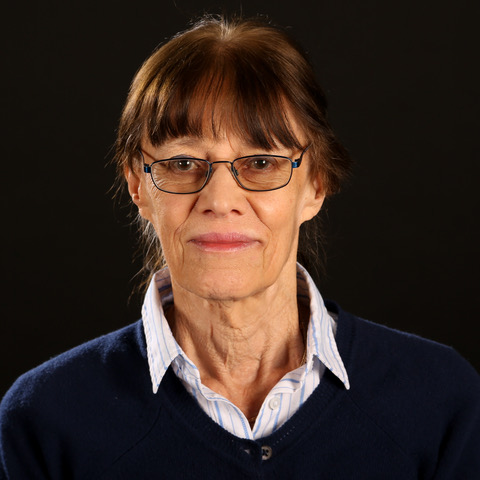
- Born: Jennifer Denise Hicks; 1941 (age 84–85); South Africa
- Education: University of the Witwatersrand; University of London
- Known for: Group theory; finite geometry; combinatorial designs; coding theory
- Notable work: Designs and Their Codes (with Edward F. Assmus Jr., Cambridge University Press, 1992)
- Scientific career
- Fields: Mathematics
- Workplaces: Clemson University; Aberystwyth University; University of KwaZulu-Natal; University of the Western Cape
- Thesis: Some Topics in Finite Permutation Groups (1969)
- Doctoral advisor: Ascher Wagner

Jennifer Denise Key (née Hicks) is a retired South African mathematician whose research has concerned the interconnections between group theory, finite geometry, combinatorial designs, and coding theory. She is a professor emeritus at Clemson University in the US, and an honorary professor at Aberystwyth University in the UK, and the University of KwaZulu-Natal and University of the Western Cape in South Africa.

== Education and career ==
Key graduated with honours from the University of the Witwatersrand in 1963, and went to the University of London for graduate study in mathematics, earning a master's degree in 1967 and completing her Ph.D. in 1969. Her dissertation, Some Topics in Finite Permutation Groups, was supervised by Ascher Wagner.

She worked as an academic in England, at the University of Surrey, University of Reading, University of Manchester, and University of Birmingham, before moving to the US in 1990 to take a faculty position at Clemson University. She retired as professor emeritus in 2007.

Between 1997 and 2024 she was one of the three editors-in-chief of the journal Designs, Codes and Cryptography.

== Book ==
Key is the author, with Edward F. Assmus Jr., of the book Designs and Their Codes (Cambridge University Press, 1992).
