= Sergei Chernikov =

Russian mathematician

- Сергей Николаевич Черников
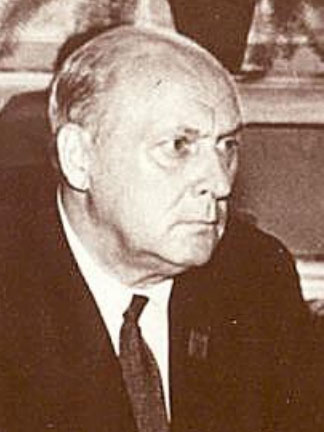
- Born: Sergei Nikolaevich Chernikov; 11 May 1912; Sergiyev Posad, Russia
- Died: 23 January 1987 (aged 74)
- Known for: Group theory, linear programming
- Awards: Krylov Prize (1973); Order of Friendship of Peoples (1982)
- Scientific career
- Fields: Mathematics
- Doctoral advisor: Aleksandr Gennadievich Kurosh
- Notable students: Victor Glushkov

Sergei Nikolaevich Chernikov (11 May 1912 – 23 January 1987; Russian: Сергей Николаевич Черников) was a Russian mathematician who contributed significantly to the development of infinite group theory and linear inequalities.

== Biography ==
Chernikov was born on 11 May 1912 in Sergiyev Posad, in Moscow Oblast, Russia, to Nikolai Nikolaevich, a priest, and Anna Alekseevna, a housewife. After graduating from secondary school, he worked as a labourer, as a driver, as a book-keeper and as an accountant. Until November 1931 he taught mathematics in a school for workers. From 1930 he was an external student of the Pedagogic Institute of Saratov State University, where he graduated in 1933. He began graduate studies at the Ural Industrial Institute under the outside tutelage of Alexandr G. Kurosh (of the University of Moscow). A remarkable student, Chernikov was made head of the Ural Mathematics department (1939–1946) immediately after earning his PhD in 1938, even before defending his DSc in 1940. He went on to be head of mathematical departments at Ural State University (1946–1951), Perm State University (1951–1961), the Steklov Institute of Mathematics (1961–1964), and finally the National Academy of Sciences of Ukraine from 1964 until days before his death in 1987. During his career, he trained more than 40 PhD and 7 DSc students, and published dozens of papers that remained influential 100 years after his birth.

== Contributions ==
Chernikov is credited with introducing a number of fundamental concepts to group theory, including the locally finite group, and nilpotent group. As with many of his other contributions, these allow infinite groups to be partially or locally solved, establishing important early links between finite and infinite group theories. Later in his career, he was hailed as "one of the pioneers of linear programming", for his breakthrough algebraic theory of linear inequalities.

== Published works ==
- Chernikov S.N. (1939) Infinite special groups. Mat. Sbornik 6, 199–214
- Chernikov S.N. (1940) Infinite locally soluble groups. Mat. Sbornik 7, 35–61
- Chernikov S.N. (1940) To theory of infinite special groups. Mat. Sbornik 7, 539–548.
- Chernikov S.N. (1940) On groups with Sylow sets. Mat. Sbornik 8, 377–394.
- Chernikov S.N. (1943) To theory of locally soluble groups. Mat. Sbornik 13, 317–333.
- Chernikov S.N. (1946) Divisible groups possesses an ascending central series. Mat. Sbornik 18, 397–422.
- Chernikov S.N. (1947) To the theory of finite p – extensions of abelian p – groups. Doklady AN USSR, 58, 1287–1289. Journal Algebra Discrete Math. M.
- Kurosh A.G., Chernikov S.N. (1947) Soluble and nilpotent groups. Uspekhi Math. Nauk 2, number 3, 18 – 59.
- Chernikov S.N. (1948) Infinite layer – finite groups. Mat. Sbornik 22, 101–133.
- Chernikov S.N. (1948) To the theory of divisible groups. Mat. Sbornik 22, 319–348.
- Chernikov S.N. (1948) A complement to the paper “To the theory of divisible groups”. Mat. Sbornik 22, 455–456.
- Chernikov S.N. (1949) To the theory of torsion – free groups possesses an ascending central series. Uchenye zapiski Ural University 7, 3–21.
- Chernikov S.N. (1950) On divisible groups with ascending central series. Doklady AN USSR 70, 965–968.
- Chernikov S.N. (1950) On a centralizer of divisible abelian normal subgroups in infinite periodic groups. Doklady AN USSR 72, 243–246.
- Chernikov S.N. (1950) Periodic ZA – extension of divisible groups. Mat. Sbornik 27, 117 – 128.
- Chernikov S.N. (1955) On complementability of Sylow p-subgroups in some classes of infinite groups. Mat. Sbornik. – 37, 557 – 566.
- Chernikov S.N. (1957) On groups with finite conjugacy classes. Doklady AN USSR 114, 1177 – 1179
- Chernikov S.N. (1957) On a structure of groups with finite conjugate classes. Doklady AN SSSR – 115, 60 – 63.
- Chernikov S.N. (1958) On layer – finite groups. Mat. Sbornik 45, 415–416.
- Chernikov S.N. (1959) Finiteness conditions in general group theory. Uspekhi Math. Nauk 14, 45 – 96.
- Chernikov S.N. (1960) On infinite locally finite groups with finite Sylow subgroups. Mat. Sbornik 52, 647 – 652.
- Chernikov S.N. (1967) Groups with prescribed properties of a system of infinite subgroups. Ukrain. Math. Journal 19, 111 – 131.
- Chernikov S.N. (1969) Investigations of groups with prescribed properties of subgroups. Ukrain. Math. Journal 21, 193 – 209.
- Chernikov S.N. (1971) On a problem of Schmidt. Ukrain. Math. Journal 23, 598 – 603
- Chernikov S.N. (1971) On groups with the restrictions for subgroups. “Groups with the restrictions for subgroups”, NAUKOVA DUMKA: Kyiv 17 – 39.
- Chernikov S.N. (1975) Groups with dense system of complement subgroups. “Some problems of group theory”, MATH. INSTITUT: Kyiv 5 – 29.
- Chernikov S.N. (1980) The groups with prescribed properties of systems of subgroups. NAUKA : Moscow.
- Chernikov S.N. (1980) Infinite groups, defined by the properties of system of infinite subgroups. “VI Simposium on group theory”, NAUKOVA DUMKA: Kyiv 5 – 22.
