= Jakob Levitzki =

Israeli mathematician (1904–1956)

- יעקב לויצקי
- Born: 17 August 1904; Kherson, Russian Empire
- Died: 25 February 1956 (age 51); Jerusalem, Israel
- Education: University of Göttingen
- Known for: Levitzky's theorem, Amitsur–Levitzki theorem, Hopkins–Levitzki theorem
- Scientific career
- Fields: Mathematics
- Workplaces: Hebrew University
- Doctoral advisor: Emmy Noether
- Doctoral students: Shimshon Amitsur
- Other notable students: Haya Freedman

Jakob Levitzki, also known as Yaakov Levitsky (Hebrew: יעקב לויצקי; 17 August 1904 – 25 February 1956), was an Israeli mathematician.

== Biography ==
Levitzki was born in 1904 in the Ukrainian city, Kherson, then part of the Russian Empire. In 1912 he emigrated to then Ottoman-ruled Palestine. After completing his studies at the Herzliya Gymnasia, he travelled to Germany and, in 1929, obtained a doctorate in mathematics from the University of Göttingen under the supervision of Emmy Noether. In 1931, after two years at Yale University, in New Haven, Connecticut, Levitzki returned to then British-ruled Mandatory Palestine to join the faculty at the Hebrew University of Jerusalem.

== Awards ==
Levitzki together with Shimshon Amitsur, who had been one of his students at the Hebrew University, were each awarded the Israel Prize in exact sciences in 1953, the inaugural year of the prize, for their work on the laws of noncommutative rings.

Levitzki's son Alexander Levitzki, a recipient of the Israel Prize in 1990, in life sciences, established the Levitzki Prize in the name of his parents, Jacob and Charlotte, for Israeli research in the field of algebra.

== See also ==
- List of Israel Prize recipients
- List of Jews born in the former Russian Empire
- Levitzki
