= Aleksandr Kurosh =

Soviet mathematician (1908–1971)

Aleksandr Gennadyevich Kurosh (Russian: Алекса́ндр Генна́диевич Ку́рош; January 19, 1908 – May 18, 1971) was a Soviet mathematician, known for his work in abstract algebra. He is credited with writing The Theory of Groups, the first modern and high-level text on group theory, published in 1944.

He was born in Yartsevo, in the Dukhovshchinsky Uyezd of the Smolensk Governorate of the Russian Empire and died in Moscow. He received his doctorate from the Moscow State University in 1936 under the direction of Pavel Alexandrov. In 1937 he became a professor there, and from 1949 until his death he held the Chair of Higher Algebra at Moscow State University. In 1938, he was the PhD thesis adviser to his fellow group theory scholar Sergei Chernikov, with whom he would develop important relationships between finite and infinite groups, discover the Kurosh-Chernikov class of groups, and publish several influential papers over the next decades. In all, he had 27 PhD students, including also Vladimir Andrunakievich, Mark Graev, and Anatoly Shirshov.

On the whole stretch of a long and very fruitful period 1930–1971, A. G. Kurosh and his students have obtained many interesting and deep results in the theory of associative algebras, lattice theory, general theory of radicals, theory of categories, theory of universal algebras, linear multioperator rings and algebras, Ω-rings, etc.

== Selected publications ==
- Teoriya Grupp (Теория групп), 2 vols., Nauk, 1944, 2nd edition 1953.
  - German translation: Gruppentheorie. 2 vols., 1953, 1956, Akademie Verlag, Berlin, 2nd edition 1970, 1972.
  - English translation: The Theory of Groups, 2 vols., Chelsea Publishing Company, the Bronx, tr. by K. A. Hirsch, 1950, 2nd edition 1955.
- Vorlesungen über Allgemeine Algebra. Verlag Harri Deutsch, Zürich 1964.
- Zur Theorie der Kategorien. Deutscher Verlag der Wissenschaften, Berlin 1963.
- Kurosch: Zur Zerlegung unendlicher Gruppen. Mathematische Annalen vol. 106, 1932.
- Kurosch: Über freie Produkte von Gruppen. Mathematische Annalen vol. 108, 1933.
- Kurosch: Die Untergruppen der freien Produkte von beliebigen Gruppen. Mathematische Annalen, vol. 109, 1934.
- A. G. Kurosh, S. N. Chernikov, “Solvable and nilpotent groups”, Uspekhi Mat. Nauk, 2:3(19) (1947), 18–59.
- A. G. Kurosh, "Curso de Álgebra Superior", Editorial Mir, Moscú 1997, traducción de Emiliano Aparicio Bernardo (in Spanish)

== See also ==
- Kurosh subgroup theorem
- Kurosh problem
