= Alexander Levitzki =

Israeli biochemist (born 1940)

- אלכסנדר לויצקי
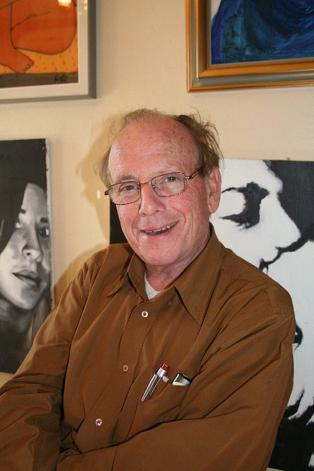
- Born: 13 August 1940 (age 86); Jerusalem, Mandatory Palestine
- Education: Hebrew University of Jerusalem
- Known for: Developing specific chemical inhibitors of cancer-induced protein kinases
- Awards: EMET Prize (2017); Wolf Prize in Medicine (2005); Israel Prize (1990)
- Scientific career
- Fields: Biochemistry
- Workplaces: Hebrew University of Jerusalem

Alexander Levitzki (Hebrew: אלכסנדר לויצקי; born 13 August 1940) is an Israeli biochemist who is a professor of biochemistry at the Alexander Silberman Institute of Life Sciences, the Hebrew University of Jerusalem.

== Birth and education ==
Levitzki was born in 1940 in British Mandate for Palestine. He attended high school at the Hebrew University Secondary School. He completed his M.Sc. in chemistry from the Hebrew University of Jerusalem in Israel. He received his Ph.D. in biochemistry and biophysics from the Hebrew University of Jerusalem and the Weizmann Institute of Science, in 1968. From 1968 to 1971, he was a post-doctoral fellow at the Department of Biochemistry, University of California at Berkeley in California, with Professor Daniel E. Koshland, Jr., where he worked in particular on negative cooperativity and half-of-the-sites reactivity. Levitzki is not a descendant of the Hebrew Levite tribe.

== Academic career ==
In 1970, Levitzki became a senior scientist at the Department of Biophysics, Weizmann Institute of Science. In 1974, he became an associate professor at the same institute.

In 1974, he became an associate professor at the Hebrew University of Jerusalem. In 1976, he was promoted to professor of biochemistry at the Hebrew University of Jerusalem. He has been visiting scientist at the National Cancer Institute, and Fogarty International Scholar, NIH, Bethesda, Maryland, visiting scholar at Stanford University in California, visiting professor at the University of Oregon (Eugene) and visiting professor at the University of California, San Francisco. He is also a member of the Israel Academy of Sciences and Humanities and was the head of its science section.

== Research ==
Levitzki is known for developing specific chemical inhibitors of cancer-induced protein kinases. He was the first to develop systematically tyrosine phosphorylation inhibitors (tyrphostins) against a wide spectrum of protein tyrosine kinases. Levitzki demonstrated (1993) that such an inhibitor of Bcr-Abl kinase induces death of chronic myeloid leukemia (CML) cells. This work led to the development of Gleevec by Novartis (1996), which is currently used, with great success, for therapy of patients afflicted by this disease. Levitzki also pioneered the inhibitors of EGF receptor, PDGF receptor, Her-2/neu, Jak-2, VEGFR and peptide based cell permeable PKB/Akt inhibitors. Levitzki also showed that PDGFR kinase inhibitors (PDGFR directed tyrphostins), released from nanoparticles or from a drug eluting stent can be used to inhibit restenosis after balloon angioplasty.

In 2006 his research team developed a method for inducing brain tumor cells to "commit suicide".

== Awards ==
In 1990, he was awarded the Israel Prize, in life sciences (following in the footsteps of his father, Jacob Levitzki, who had received the prize, for exact sciences, in 1953).

In 2005, he was awarded the Wolf Prize in Medicine for "pioneering signal transduction therapy and for developing tyrosine kinase inhibitors as effective agents against cancer and a range of other diseases".

- I. & H. Wachter Award, I. & H. Wachter Foundation (2014)

== See also ==
- List of Israel Prize recipients
