= Amitai Regev =

Israeli mathematician

- אמיתי רגב
- Born: December 7, 1940 (age 85)
- Education: Hebrew University of Jerusalem
- Known for: Regev's theorem, polynomial identity rings, connections between PI rings and representations of the symmetric group
- Scientific career
- Fields: Mathematics
- Workplaces: Weizmann Institute of Science
- Doctoral advisor: Shimshon Amitsur

Amitai Regev (Hebrew: אמיתי רגב; born December 7, 1940) is an Israeli mathematician, known for his work in ring theory.

He is the Herman P. Taubman Professor of Mathematics at the Weizmann Institute of Science. He received his doctorate from the Hebrew University of Jerusalem in 1972, under the direction of Shimshon Amitsur.

Regev has made significant contributions to the theory of polynomial identity rings (PI rings). In particular, he proved Regev's theorem that the tensor product of two PI rings is again a PI ring. He developed so-called "Regev theory" that connects PI rings to representations of the symmetric group, and hence to Young tableaux. He has made seminal contributions to the asymptotic enumeration of Young tableaux and tableaux of hook shape, and together with William Beckner proved the Macdonald-Selberg conjecture for the infinite Lie algebras of type B, C, and D.
