= Ascher Wagner =

Austrian and British mathematician (1930–2000)

Ascher Otto Wagner (12 October 1930, in Vienna – 27 May 2000, in London) was an Austrian and British mathematician, specializing in the theory of finite groups and finite projective planes. He is known for the Dembowski–Wagner theorem.

Ascher Wagner received his Ph.D. in 1958 with the dissertation Some Problems on Projective Planes and Related Topics in the Theory of Algebraic Operations supervised by Kurt Hirsch. Wagner was a faculty member at the University of London and then at the University of Birmingham.

In 1958 he married Gillian Mary Jaidka (1929–1993) in Hampstead, London.

== Selected publications ==
- Ostrom, T. G.; Wagner, A. (1959). "On projective and affine planes with transitive collineation groups". Mathematische Zeitschrift. 71: 186–199. doi:10.1007/BF01181398. S2CID 120229235.
- Livingstone, Donald; Wagner, Ascher (1965). "Transitivity of finite permutation groups on unordered sets". Mathematische Zeitschrift. 90 (5): 393–403. doi:10.1007/BF01112361. hdl:2027.42/46299. S2CID 122851941.
- Wagner, A. (1966). "Normal subgroups of triply-transitive permutation groups of odd degree". Mathematische Zeitschrift. 94 (3): 219–222. doi:10.1007/BF01111350. S2CID 121594270.
- Wagner, A. (1967). "On the classification of the classical groups". Mathematische Zeitschrift. 97: 66–76. doi:10.1007/BF01111124. S2CID 119555774.
- Wagner, Ascher (1974). "Groups generated by elations". Abhandlungen aus dem Mathematischen Seminar der Universität Hamburg. 41: 190–205. doi:10.1007/BF02993513. S2CID 122286736.
- Wagner, Ascher (1976). "The faithful linear representation of least degree of S_{n} and A_{n} over a field of characteristic 2". Mathematische Zeitschrift. 151 (2): 127–137. doi:10.1007/BF01213989. S2CID 125109537.
- Wagner, Ascher (1977). "The faithful linear representations of least degree of S_{n} and A_{n} over a field of odd characteristic". Mathematische Zeitschrift. 154 (2): 103–114. doi:10.1007/BF01241824. S2CID 121778952.
- Wagner, Ascher (1977). "An observation on the degrees of projective representations of the symmetric and alternating group over an arbitrary field". Archiv der Mathematik. 29: 583–589. doi:10.1007/BF01220457. S2CID 120794659.
- Wagner, Ascher (1978). "The subgroups of PSL(5,2^{a})". Results in Mathematics. 1 (1–2): 207–226. doi:10.1007/BF03322937. S2CID 120709916.
- Wagner, A. (1978). "Collineation groups generated by homologies of order greater than 2". Geometriae Dedicata. 7 (4). doi:10.1007/BF00152059. S2CID 120165236.
- Di Martino, Lino; Wagner, Ascher (1979). "The irreducible subgroups of PSL(V_{5},q), where q is odd". Results in Mathematics. 2 (1–2): 54–61. doi:10.1007/BF03322944. S2CID 120441757.
- Wagner, Ascher (1980). "Determination of the finite primitive reflection groups over an arbitrary field of characteristic not 2". Geometriae Dedicata. 9 (2). doi:10.1007/BF00147439. S2CID 122038455.
- Wagner, Ascher (1981). "Determination of the finite primitive reflection groups over an arbitrary field of characteristic not two". Geometriae Dedicata. 10 (1–4): 191–203. doi:10.1007/BF01447423. S2CID 189876932.
- Wagner, Ascher (1981). "Determination of the finite primitive reflection groups over an arbitrary field of characteristic not 2". Geometriae Dedicata. 10 (1–4): 475–523. doi:10.1007/BF01447440. S2CID 189877102.
- Wagner, Ascher (1981). "Theorems About Reidemeister Conditions". In: Plaumann P., Strambach K. (eds.) Geometry — von Staudt's Point of View. NATO Advanced Study Institutes Series (Series C — Mathematical and Physical Sciences). Vol. 70. Dordrecht: Springer. pp. 249–273. doi:10.1007/978-94-009-8489-9_10. ISBN 978-94-009-8491-2.
- Wagner, Ascher (1983). "Some reflections on the history of the study of finite projective planes". In Johnson, Norman L.; Kallaher, Michael J.; Long, Calvin T. (eds.). In: Finite Geometries: Proceedings of a Conference in Honor of T. G. Ostrom. Lecture Notes in Pure and Applied Mathematics, vol. 82. CRC Press. pp. 419–426. ISBN 978-0-8247-1052-1.
- Siemons, Johannes; Wagner, Ascher (1985). "On finite permutation groups with the same orbits on unordered sets" (PDF). Archiv der Mathematik. 45 (6): 492–500. doi:10.1007/BF01194888. S2CID 55745363.
- Key, Jennifer D.; Siemons, Johannes; Wagner, Ascher (1986). "Regular sets on the projective line" (PDF). Journal of Geometry. 27 (2): 188–194. doi:10.1007/BF01224556. S2CID 121690146.
