= Locally nilpotent =

In the mathematical field of commutative algebra, an ideal I in a commutative ring A is locally nilpotent at a prime ideal p if I_{p}, the localization of I at p, is a nilpotent ideal in A_{p}.

In non-commutative algebra and group theory, an algebra or group is locally nilpotent if and only if every finitely generated subalgebra or subgroup is nilpotent. The subgroup generated by the normal locally nilpotent subgroups is called the Hirsch–Plotkin radical and is the generalization of the Fitting subgroup to groups without the ascending chain condition on normal subgroups.

A locally nilpotent ring is one in which every finitely generated subring is nilpotent: locally nilpotent rings form a radical class, giving rise to the Levitzki radical.
