= Amitsur–Levitzki theorem =

States that the algebra of n by n matrices satisfies a certain identity of degree 2n

In algebra, the Amitsur–Levitzki theorem states that the algebra of n × n matrices over a commutative ring satisfies a certain identity of degree 2n. It was proved by Amitsur and Levitsky (1950). In particular matrix rings are polynomial identity rings such that the smallest identity they satisfy has degree exactly 2n.

== Statement ==
The standard polynomial of degree n is
$$S_n(x_1,\dots,x_n) = \sum_{\sigma\in S_{n}}\text{sgn}(\sigma)x_{\sigma(1)} \cdots x_{\sigma(n)}$$
in non-commuting variables x_{1}, ..., x_{n}, where the sum is taken over all n! elements of the symmetric group S_{n}.

The Amitsur–Levitzki theorem states that for n × n matrices A_{1}, ..., A_{2n} whose entries are taken from a commutative ring then

$$S_{2n}(A_1,\dots,A_{2n}) = 0.$$

== Proofs ==
Amitsur and Levitzki (1950) gave the first proof.

Kostant (1958) deduced the Amitsur–Levitzki theorem from the Koszul–Samelson theorem about primitive cohomology of Lie algebras.

Swan (1963) and Swan (1969) gave a simple combinatorial proof as follows. By linearity it is enough to prove the theorem when each matrix has only one nonzero entry, which is 1. In this case each matrix can be encoded as a directed edge of a graph with n vertices. So all matrices together give a graph on n vertices with 2n directed edges. The identity holds provided that for any two vertices A and B of the graph, the number of odd Eulerian paths from A to B is the same as the number of even ones. (Here a path is called odd or even depending on whether its edges taken in order give an odd or even permutation of the 2n edges.) Swan showed that this was the case provided the number of edges in the graph is at least 2n, thus proving the Amitsur–Levitzki theorem.

Razmyslov (1974) gave a proof related to the Cayley–Hamilton theorem.

Rosset (1976) gave a short proof using the exterior algebra of a vector space of dimension 2n.

Procesi (2015) gave another proof, showing that the Amitsur–Levitzki theorem is the Cayley–Hamilton identity for the generic Grassman matrix. Claudio Procesi's proof used a similar technique to Rosset but is presented in a way that could make the theorem more easily transferrable to other problems. A principal property used in this proof is antisymmetry to convert a multilinear expression to an antisymmetric one.
