= Mark Iosifovich Graev =

Russian mathematician (1922–2017)

Mark Iosifovich Graev (Марк Иосифович Граев, 21 November 1922, Moscow – 22 April 2017) was a Russian mathematician. He is known as one of the namesakes in the Gelfand–Graev representation.

== Education and career ==
Graev received his doctorate in 1947 from Lomonosov Moscow State University with thesis Free topological groups under the supervision of Alexander Kurosh. Graev was a professor at the Scientific Research Institute of System Development of the Russian Academy of Sciences and the Keldysh Institute of Applied Mathematics of the Russian Academy of Sciences.

He was a member of the Moscow circle of Israel Gelfand, with whom he wrote several books. Graev was the co-author with Gelfand and Ilya Piatetski-Shapiro of volume 5 (Integral Geometry and Representation Theory) and the co-author with Gelfand and Naum Ya. Vilenkin of volume 6 (Representation Theory and Automorphic Functions) in the 6-volume monograph series Generalized Functions. In 1966 Graev was an Invited Speaker at the International Congress of Mathematicians (ICM) in Moscow. His ICM presentation Theory of Representation of Groups was joint work with Alexander Kirillov.
