= Nilsemigroup =

In mathematics, and more precisely in semigroup theory, a nilsemigroup or nilpotent semigroup is a semigroup whose every element is nilpotent.

== Definitions ==
Formally, a semigroup S is a nilsemigroup if:

- S contains 0 and
- for each element a∈S, there exists a positive integer k such that a^{k}=0.

=== Finite nilsemigroups ===
Equivalent definitions exists for finite semigroup. A finite semigroup S is nilpotent if, equivalently:

- $x_1\dots x_n=y_1\dots y_n$ for each $x_i,y_i\in S$, where $n$ is the cardinality of S.
- The zero is the only idempotent of S.

== Examples ==
The trivial semigroup of a single element is trivially a nilsemigroup.

The set of strictly upper triangular matrix, with matrix multiplication is nilpotent.

Let $I_n=[a,n]$ a bounded interval of positive real numbers. For x, y belonging to I, define $x\star_n y$ as $\min(x+y,n)$. We now show that $\langle I,\star_n\rangle$ is a nilsemigroup whose zero is n. For each natural number k, kx is equal to $\min(kx,n)$. For k at least equal to $\left\lceil\frac{n-x}{x}\right\rceil$, kx equals n. This example generalize for any bounded interval of an Archimedean ordered semigroup.

== Properties ==
A non-trivial nilsemigroup does not contain an identity element. It follows that the only nilpotent monoid is the trivial monoid.

The class of nilsemigroups is:

- closed under taking subsemigroups
- closed under taking quotients
- closed under finite products
- but is not closed under arbitrary direct product. Indeed, take the semigroup $S=\prod_{n\in\mathbb N}\langle I_n,\star_n\rangle$, where $\langle I_n,\star_n\rangle$ is defined as above. The semigroup S is a direct product of nilsemigroups, however its contains no nilpotent element.

It follows that the class of nilsemigroups is not a variety of universal algebra. However, the set of finite nilsemigroups is a variety of finite semigroups. The variety of finite nilsemigroups is defined by the profinite equalities $x^\omega y=x^\omega=yx^\omega$.
