= Central polynomial =

In algebra, a central polynomial for n-by-n matrices is a polynomial in non-commuting variables that is non-constant but yields a scalar matrix whenever it is evaluated at n-by-n matrices. That such polynomials exist for any square matrices was discovered in 1970 independently by Formanek and Razmyslov. The term "central" is because the evaluation of a central polynomial has the image lying in the center of the matrix ring over any commutative ring. The notion has an application to the theory of polynomial identity rings.

Example: $(xy - yx)^2$ is a central polynomial for 2-by-2-matrices. Indeed, by the Cayley–Hamilton theorem, one has that $(xy - yx)^2 = -\det(xy - yx)I$ for any 2-by-2-matrices x and y.

== See also ==
- Generic matrix ring
