= Amitsur complex =

In algebra, the Amitsur complex is a natural complex associated to a ring homomorphism. It was introduced by Shimshon Amitsur. When the homomorphism is faithfully flat, the Amitsur complex is exact (thus determining a resolution), which is the basis of the theory of faithfully flat descent.

The notion should be thought of as a mechanism to go beyond the conventional localization of rings and modules.

== Definition ==
Let $\theta: R \to S$ be a homomorphism of (not-necessary-commutative) rings. First define the cosimplicial set $C^\bullet = S^{\otimes \bullet+1}$ (where $\otimes$ refers to $\otimes_R$, not $\otimes_{\Z}$) as follows. Define the face maps $d^i : S^{\otimes {n+1}} \to S^{\otimes n+2}$ by inserting $1$ at the $i$th spot: (Note: The reference (M. Artin) seems to have a typo, and this should be the correct formula; see the calculation of $s_0$ and $d^2$ in the note.)

$$d^i(x_0 \otimes \cdots \otimes x_n) = x_0 \otimes \cdots \otimes x_{i-1} \otimes 1 \otimes x_i \otimes \cdots \otimes x_n.$$

Define the degeneracies $s^i : S^{\otimes n+1} \to S^{\otimes n}$ by multiplying out the $i$th and $(i+1)$th spots:

$$s^i(x_0 \otimes \cdots \otimes x_n) = x_0 \otimes \cdots \otimes x_i x_{i+1} \otimes \cdots \otimes x_n.$$

They satisfy the "obvious" cosimplicial identities and thus $S^{\otimes \bullet + 1}$ is a cosimplicial set. It then determines the complex with the augumentation $\theta$, the Amitsur complex:

$$0 \to R \,\overset{\theta}\to\, S \,\overset{\delta^0}\to\, S^{\otimes 2} \,\overset{\delta^1}\to\, S^{\otimes 3} \to \cdots$$

where $\delta^n = \sum_{i=0}^{n+1} (-1)^i d^i.$

== Exactness of the Amitsur complex ==
=== Faithfully flat case ===
In the above notations, if $\theta$ is right faithfully flat, then a theorem of Alexander Grothendieck states that the (augmented) complex $0 \to R \overset{\theta}\to S^{\otimes \bullet + 1}$ is exact and thus is a resolution. More generally, if $\theta$ is right faithfully flat, then, for each left $R$-module $M$,

$$0 \to M \to S \otimes_R M \to S^{\otimes 2} \otimes_R M \to S^{\otimes 3} \otimes_R M \to \cdots$$

is exact.

Proof:

Step 1: The statement is true if $\theta : R \to S$ splits as a ring homomorphism.

That "$\theta$ splits" is to say $\rho \circ \theta = \operatorname{id}_R$ for some homomorphism $\rho : S \to R$ ($\rho$ is a retraction and $\theta$ a section). Given such a $\rho$, define

$$h : S^{\otimes n+1} \otimes M \to S^{\otimes n} \otimes M$$

by

$$\begin{align}
& h(x_0 \otimes m) = \rho(x_0) \otimes m, \\
& h(x_0 \otimes \cdots \otimes x_n \otimes m) = \theta(\rho(x_0)) x_1 \otimes \cdots \otimes x_n \otimes m.
\end{align}$$

An easy computation shows the following identity: with $\delta^{-1}=\theta \otimes \operatorname{id}_M : M \to S \otimes_R M$,

$$h \circ \delta^n + \delta^{n-1} \circ h = \operatorname{id}_{S^{\otimes n+1} \otimes M}$$.

This is to say that $h$ is a homotopy operator and so $\operatorname{id}_{S^{\otimes n+1} \otimes M}$ determines the zero map on cohomology: i.e., the complex is exact.

Step 2: The statement is true in general.

We remark that $S \to T := S \otimes_R S, \, x \mapsto 1 \otimes x$ is a section of $T \to S, \, x \otimes y \mapsto xy$. Thus, Step 1 applied to the split ring homomorphism $S \to T$ implies:

$$0 \to M_S \to T \otimes_S M_S \to T^{\otimes 2} \otimes_S M_S \to \cdots,$$

where $M_S = S \otimes_R M$, is exact. Since $T \otimes_S M_S \simeq S^{\otimes 2} \otimes_R M$, etc., by "faithfully flat", the original sequence is exact. $\square$

=== Arc topology case ===
Bhatt and Scholze show that the Amitsur complex is exact if $R$ and $S$ are (commutative) perfect rings, and the map is required to be a covering in the arc topology (which is a weaker condition than being a cover in the flat topology).
