= Faithfully flat descent =

Technique from algebraic geometry

Faithfully flat descent or flat descent is a technique from algebraic geometry, allowing one to draw conclusions about objects on the target of a faithfully flat morphism. Such morphisms, that are flat and surjective, are common, one example coming from an open cover.

In practice, from an affine point of view, this technique allows one to prove some statement about a ring or scheme after faithfully flat base change.

In the language of stacks, flat descent is exactly the statement that the prestack of quasi-coherent sheaves is a stack with respect to étale (or fpqc) topology.

"Vanilla" faithfully flat descent is generally false; instead, faithfully flat descent is valid under some finiteness conditions (e.g., quasi-compact or locally of finite presentation).

A faithfully flat descent is a special case of Beck's monadicity theorem.

== Idea ==
Given a faithfully flat ring homomorphism $A \to B$, the faithfully flat descent is, roughly, the statement that to give a module or an algebra over A is to give a module or an algebra over $B$ together with the so-called descent datum (or data). That is to say one can descend the objects (or even statements) on $B$ to $A$ provided some additional data.

For example, given some elements $f_1, \dots, f_r$ generating the unit ideal of A, $B = \prod_i A[f_i^{-1}]$ is faithfully flat over $A$. Geometrically, $\operatorname{Spec}(B) = \bigcup_{i = 1}^r \operatorname{Spec}(A[f_i^{-1}])$ is an open cover of $\operatorname{Spec}(A)$ and so descending a module from $B$ to $A$ would mean gluing modules $M_i$ on $A[f_i^{-1}]$ to get a module on A; the descend datum in this case amounts to the gluing data; i.e., how $M_i, M_j$ are identified on overlaps $\operatorname{Spec}(A[f_i^{-1}, f_j^{-1}])$.

== Affine case ==
Let $A \to B$ be a faithfully flat ring homomorphism. Given an $A$-module $M$, we get the $B$-module $N = M \otimes_A B$ and because $A \to B$ is faithfully flat, we have the inclusion $M \hookrightarrow M \otimes_A B$. Moreover, we have the isomorphism $\varphi : N \otimes B \overset{\sim}\to N \otimes B$ of $B^{\otimes 2}$-modules that is induced by the isomorphism $B^{\otimes 2} \simeq B^{\otimes 2}, x \otimes y \mapsto y \otimes x$ and that satisfies the cocycle condition:

$$\varphi^1 = \varphi^0 \circ \varphi^2$$

where $\varphi^i : N \otimes B^{\otimes 2} \overset{\sim}\to N \otimes B^{\otimes 2}$ are given as:

$$\varphi^0(n \otimes b \otimes c) = \rho^1(b) \varphi(n \otimes c)$$
$$\varphi^1(n \otimes b \otimes c) = \rho^2(b) \varphi(n \otimes c)$$
$$\varphi^2(n \otimes b \otimes c) = \varphi(n \otimes b) \otimes c$$

with $\rho^i(x)(y_0 \otimes \cdots \otimes y_r) = y_0 \cdots y_{i-1} \otimes x \otimes y_i \cdots y_r$. Note the isomorphisms $\varphi^i : N \otimes B^{\otimes 2} \overset{\sim}\to N \otimes B^{\otimes 2}$ are determined only by $\varphi$ and do not involve $M.$

Now, the most basic form of faithfully flat descent says that the above construction can be reversed; i.e., given a $B$-module $N$ and a $B^{\otimes 2}$-module isomorphism $\varphi : N \otimes B \overset{\sim}\to N \otimes B$ such that $\varphi^1 = \varphi^0 \circ \varphi^2$, an invariant submodule:

$$M = \{ n \in N | \varphi(n \otimes 1) = n \otimes 1 \} \subset N$$

is such that $M \otimes B = N$.

Here is the precise definition of descent datum. Given a ring homomorphism $A \to B$, we write:

$$d^i : B^{\otimes n} \to B^{\otimes {n+1}}$$

for the map given by inserting $A \to B$ in the i-th spot; i.e., $d^0$ is given as $B^{\otimes n} \simeq A \otimes_A B^{\otimes n} \to B \otimes_A B^{\otimes n} = B^{\otimes {n+1}}$, $d^1$ as $B^{\otimes n} \simeq B \otimes A \otimes B^{\otimes n-1} \to B^{\otimes {n+1}}$, etc. We also write $- \otimes_{d^i} B^{\otimes {n+1}}$ for tensoring over $B^{\otimes n}$ when $B^{\otimes {n+1}}$ is given the module structure by $d^i$.

Descent datum—Given a ring homomorphism $A \to B$, a descent datum on a module N on $B$ is a $B^{\otimes 2}$-module isomorphism

$$\varphi: N \otimes_{d^1} B^{\otimes 2} \overset{\sim}\to N \otimes_{d^0} B^{\otimes 2}$$

that satisfies the cocycle condition: $\varphi \otimes_{d^1} B^{\otimes 3}$ is the same as the composition $\varphi \otimes_{d^0} B^{\otimes 3} \circ \varphi \otimes_{d^2} B^{\otimes 3}$.

Now, given a $B$-module $N$ with a descent datum $\varphi$, define $M$ to be the kernel of

$$d^0 - \varphi \circ d^1 : N \to N \otimes_{d^0} B^{\otimes 2}$$.

Consider the natural map

$$M \otimes B \to N, \, x \otimes a \mapsto xa$$.

The key point is that this map is an isomorphism if $A \to B$ is faithfully flat. This is seen by considering the following:

$$\begin{array}{lccclcl}
0 & \to & M \otimes_A B & \to & \quad N \otimes_A B & \xrightarrow{d^0 - \varphi \circ d^1} & N \otimes_{d^0} B^{\otimes 2} \otimes_A B \\
&     & \downarrow & & \varphi \circ d^1 \downarrow & & \quad \downarrow \varphi \otimes_{d^0, d^1} B^{\otimes 3} \circ d^2 \\
0 & \to & N & \to & \quad N \otimes_{d^0} B^{\otimes 2} & \xrightarrow{d^0 - d^1} & N \otimes_{d^0, d^1} B^{\otimes 3} \\
\end{array}$$

where the top row is exact by the flatness of B over A and the bottom row is the Amitsur complex, which is exact by a theorem of Grothendieck. The cocycle condition ensures that the above diagram is commutative. Since the second and the third vertical maps are isomorphisms, so is the first one.

The forgoing can be summarized simply as follows:

Theorem—Given a faithfully flat ring homomorphism $A \to B$, the functor

$$M \mapsto (M \otimes_A B, \varphi)$$

from the category of A-modules to the category of pairs $(N, \varphi)$ consisting of a B-module N and a descent datum $\varphi$ on it is an equivalence.

== Zariski descent ==
The Zariski descent refers simply to the fact that a quasi-coherent sheaf can be obtained by gluing those on a (Zariski-)open cover. It is a special case of a faithfully flat descent but is frequently used to reduce the descent problem to the affine case.

In details, let $\mathcal{Q}coh(X)$ denote the category of quasi-coherent sheaves on a scheme X. Then Zariski descent states that, given quasi-coherent sheaves $F_i$ on open subsets $U_i \subset X$ with $X = \bigcup U_i$ and isomorphisms $\varphi_{ij} : F_i |_{U_i \cap U_j} \overset{\sim}\to F_j |_{U_i \cap U_j}$ such that (1) $\varphi_{ii} = \operatorname{id}$ and (2) $\varphi_{ik} = \varphi_{jk} \circ \varphi_{ij}$ on $U_i \cap U_j \cap U_k$, then exists a unique quasi-coherent sheaf $F$ on X such that $F|_{U_i} \simeq F_i$ in a compatible way (i.e., $F|_{U_j} \simeq F_j$ restricts to $F|_{U_i \cap U_j} \simeq F_i|_{U_i \cap U_j} \overset{\varphi_{ij}}\underset{\sim}\to F_j|_{U_i \cap U_j}$).

In a fancy language, the Zariski descent states that, with respect to the Zariski topology, $\mathcal{Q}coh$ is a stack; i.e., a category $\mathcal{C}$ equipped with the functor $p : \mathcal{C} \to$ the category of (relative) schemes that has an effective descent theory. Here, let $\mathcal{Q}coh$ denote the category consisting of pairs $(U, F)$ consisting of a (Zariski)-open subset U and a quasi-coherent sheaf on it and $p$ the forgetful functor $(U, F) \mapsto U$.

== Descent for quasi-coherent sheaves ==
There is a succinct statement for the major result in this area: (the prestack of quasi-coherent sheaves over a scheme S means that, for any S-scheme X, each X-point of the prestack is a quasi-coherent sheaf on X.)

Theorem—The prestack of quasi-coherent sheaves over a base scheme S is a stack with respect to the fpqc topology.

The proof uses Zariski descent and the faithfully flat descent in the affine case.

Here "quasi-compact" cannot be eliminated.

== Example: a vector space ==
Let F be a finite Galois field extension of a field k. Then, for each vector space V over F,

$$V \otimes_k F \simeq \prod_{\sigma} V, \, v \otimes a \mapsto \sigma(a)v$$

where the product runs over the elements in the Galois group of $F/k$.

== Specific descents ==
=== Étale descent ===
An étale descent is a consequence of a faithfully descent.

== Via the monadicity theorem ==
Let $f : X \to Y$ be a morphism of schemes and $f_*, f^*$ denote the pushforward as well the pullback for quasi-coherent sheaves (here, for simplicity, assume $f_* : \textrm{QCoh}(X) \to \textrm{QCoh}(Y)$ is well-defined.) Since $f^*$ is a left adjoint of $f_*$, the composition $T = f^* f_*$ together with the counit and the comultiplication induced by the adjunction is a comonad. Then Beck's monadicity theorem, if applicable, says that the functor

$$f^* : \textrm{QCoh}(Y) \to T-\textrm{Coalg}$$

is an equivalence, where $T-\textrm{Coalg}$ is the Eilenberg–Moore category of $T$-coalgebras; i.e., roughly, the category consists of objects in $\textrm{QCoh}(X)$ with $T$-coactions $a : F \to T(F)$ (despite the name, they are more like comodules than coalgebras). Then the key point here is that a $T$-action amounts to a descent data and thus $T-\textrm{Alg}$ can be identified as the category of quasi-coherent sheaves on $X$ together with descent data. Hence, the above exactly states the flat descent.

For example, if $f$ is a faithfully flat morphism between affine schemes, then the monadicity theorem applies and the above recovers the flat descent in the affine case. More generally, the theorem applies if $f$ is faithfully flat and has some finiteness property; e.g., a fpqc morphism.

== See also ==
- Amitsur complex
- Hilbert scheme
- Quot scheme
