= Nil ideal =

Ring subset with only nilpotent elements

In mathematics, more specifically ring theory, a left, right or two-sided ideal of a ring is said to be a nil ideal if all of its elements are nilpotent, i.e. for each $a \in I$ there exists a natural number n for which $a^n = 0.$ If all elements of a ring are nilpotent (this is possible only for rings without a unit), then the ring is called a nil ring.

The nilradical of a commutative ring is an example of a nil ideal; in fact, it is the ideal of the ring maximal with respect to the property of being nil. Unfortunately, the set of nilpotent elements does not always form an ideal for noncommutative rings. Nil ideals are still associated with interesting open questions, such as the Köthe conjecture (until its disproof in 2026).

== Commutative rings ==
In commutative rings, the nil ideals are better understood than in noncommutative rings, primarily because in commutative rings, products involving nilpotent elements and sums of nilpotent elements are both nilpotent. This is because if a and b are nilpotent elements of R with a^{n} = 0 and b^{m} = 0, and r is any element of R, then (a·r)^{n} = a^{n}·r^{n} = 0, and by the binomial theorem, (a+b)^{m+n} = 0. Therefore, the set of all nilpotent elements forms an ideal known as the nil radical of a ring. Because the nil radical contains every nilpotent element, an ideal of a commutative ring is nil if and only if it is a subset of the nil radical, and so the nil radical is maximal among nil ideals. Furthermore, for any nilpotent element a of a commutative ring R, the ideal aR is nil. For a non commutative ring however, it is not in general true that the set of nilpotent elements forms an ideal, or that a·R is a nil (one-sided) ideal, even if a is nilpotent.

== Noncommutative rings ==
The theory of nil ideals is of major importance in noncommutative ring theory. In particular, through the understanding of nil rings—rings whose every element is nilpotent—one may obtain a much better understanding of more general rings.

In the case of commutative rings, there is always a maximal nil ideal: the nilradical of the ring. The existence of such a maximal nil ideal in the case of noncommutative rings is guaranteed by the fact that the sum of nil ideals is again nil. However, the truth of the assertion that the sum of two left nil ideals is again a left nil ideal remains elusive; it is an open problem known as the Köthe conjecture. The Köthe conjecture was first posed in 1930 and yet remains unresolved as of 2025.

== Relation to nilpotent ideals ==
The notion of a nil ideal has a deep connection with that of a nilpotent ideal, and in some classes of rings, the two notions coincide. If an ideal is nilpotent, it is of course nil. There are two main barriers for nil ideals to be nilpotent:

1. There need not be an upper bound on the exponent required to annihilate elements. Arbitrarily high exponents may be required.
2. The product of n nilpotent elements may be nonzero for arbitrarily high n.

Clearly both of these barriers must be avoided for a nil ideal to qualify as nilpotent.

In a right artinian ring, any nil ideal is nilpotent. This is proved by observing that any nil ideal is contained in the Jacobson radical of the ring, and since the Jacobson radical is a nilpotent ideal (due to the artinian hypothesis), the result follows. In fact, this has been generalized to right noetherian rings; the result is known as Levitzky's theorem. A particularly simple proof due to Utumi can be found in (Herstein 1968, Theorem 1.4.5, p. 37).

== See also ==
- Köthe conjecture
- Nilpotent ideal
- Nilradical
- Jacobson radical
