= Enveloping algebra =

Enveloping algebra in mathematics may refer to:

- Universal enveloping algebra, of a Lie algebra
- Associative enveloping algebra, of a general non-associative algebra
- Enveloping algebra, of an associative algebra: see Associative algebra § Enveloping algebra
- Enveloping von Neumann algebra, of a C*-algebra
