= Hirsch–Plotkin radical =

In mathematics, especially in the study of infinite groups, the Hirsch–Plotkin radical is a subgroup describing the normal locally nilpotent subgroups of the group. It was named by Gruenberg (1961) after Kurt Hirsch and Boris I. Plotkin, who proved that the join of normal locally nilpotent subgroups is locally nilpotent; this fact is the key ingredient in its construction.

The Hirsch–Plotkin radical is defined as the subgroup generated by the union of the normal locally nilpotent subgroups (that is, those normal subgroups such that every finitely generated subgroup is nilpotent). The Hirsch–Plotkin radical is itself a locally nilpotent normal subgroup, so is the unique largest such. In a finite group, the Hirsch–Plotkin radical coincides with the Fitting subgroup but for infinite groups the two subgroups can differ. The subgroup generated by the union of infinitely many normal nilpotent subgroups need not itself be nilpotent, so the Fitting subgroup must be modified in this case.
