= Köthe conjecture =

Disproved conjecture in ring theory

In mathematics, the Köthe conjecture is a problem in ring theory. It is formulated in various ways. Suppose that R is a ring. One way to state the conjecture is that if R has no nil ideal, other than {0}, then it has no nil one-sided ideal, other than {0}.

This question was posed in 1930 by Gottfried Köthe (1905–1989). The Köthe conjecture has been shown to be true for various classes of rings, such as polynomial identity rings and right Noetherian rings. In 2026, the AI model GPT-6 Astra found an explicit counterexample which disproves the conjecture, after being prompted by Tom Adamczewski of Epoch AI. An exposition of the proof was posted by Adamczewski and ring theorists Bernhard Böhmler and Rene Marczinzik. Another counterexample was found by Greenfeld, King and Vendramin, with some assistance from GPT-6 Astra.

== Equivalent formulations ==
The conjecture has several different formulations:

1. (Köthe conjecture) In any ring, the sum of two nil left ideals is nil.
2. In any ring, the sum of two one-sided nil ideals is nil.
3. In any ring, every nil left or right ideal of the ring is contained in the upper nil radical of the ring.
4. For any ring R and for any nil ideal J of R, the matrix ideal M_{n}(J) is a nil ideal of M_{n}(R) for every n.
5. For any ring R and for any nil ideal J of R, the matrix ideal M_{2}(J) is a nil ideal of M_{2}(R).
6. For any ring R, the upper nil radical of M_{n}(R) is the set of matrices with entries from the upper nilradical of R for every positive integer n.
7. For any ring R and for any nil ideal J of R, the polynomials with indeterminate x and coefficients from J lie in the Jacobson radical of the polynomial ring R[x].
8. For any ring R, the Jacobson radical of R[x] consists of the polynomials with coefficients from the upper nilradical of R.

Necessary and sufficient conditions under which statement 3 given above does not hold have been given recently.

== Related problems ==
A conjecture by Amitsur read: "If J is a nil ideal in R, then J[x] is a nil ideal of the polynomial ring R[x]." This conjecture, if true, would have proven the Köthe conjecture through the equivalent statements above. However, in 2000 a counterexample was produced by Agata Smoktunowicz. While not a disproof of the Köthe conjecture, this fueled suspicions that the Köthe conjecture may be false.

Kegel proved a ring which is the direct sum of two nilpotent subrings is itself nilpotent. The question arose whether or not "nilpotent" could be replaced with "locally nilpotent" or "nil". Partial progress was made when Kelarev produced an example of a ring which isn't nil, but is the direct sum of two locally nilpotent rings. This demonstrates that Kegel's question with "locally nilpotent" replacing "nilpotent" is answered in the negative.

The sum of a nilpotent subring and a nil subring is always nil.

== Sources ==
- Köthe, Gottfried (1930), "Die Struktur der Ringe, deren Restklassenring nach dem Radikal vollständig reduzibel ist", Mathematische Zeitschrift, 32 (1): 161–186, doi:10.1007/BF01194626, S2CID 123292297
