= Sylvester domain =

In mathematics, a Sylvester domain, named after James Joseph Sylvester by Dicks & Sontag (1978), is a ring in which Sylvester's law of nullity holds. This means that if A is an m by n matrix, and B is an n by s matrix over R, then

ρ(AB) ≥ ρ(A) + ρ(B) – n

where ρ is the inner rank of a matrix. The inner rank of an m by n matrix is the smallest integer r such that the matrix is a product of an m by r matrix and an r by n matrix.

Sylvester (1884) showed that fields satisfy Sylvester's law of nullity and are, therefore, Sylvester domains.
