= Nilradical of a ring =

Ideal of the nilpotent elements

In algebra, the nilradical of a commutative ring is the ideal consisting of the nilpotent elements:

$$\mathfrak{N}_R  = \mathrm{Nil}(R)=\lbrace f \in R \mid f^m=0 \text{ for some } m\in\mathbb{Z}_{>0}\rbrace.$$

It is thus the radical of the zero ideal and is also denoted $\sqrt{(0)}$ or $\mathrm{rad}(0)$. If the nilradical is the zero ideal, the ring is called a reduced ring. The nilradical of a commutative ring is the intersection of all prime ideals.

In the non-commutative ring case the same definition does not always work. This has resulted in several radicals generalizing the commutative case in distinct ways; see the article Radical of a ring for more on this.

For Lie algebras there is a similar definition of nilradical.

== Commutative rings ==
The nilradical of a commutative ring is the set of all nilpotent elements in the ring, or equivalently the radical of the zero ideal. This is an ideal because the sum of any two nilpotent elements is nilpotent (by the binomial formula), and the product of any element with a nilpotent element is nilpotent (by commutativity). It can also be characterized as the intersection of all the prime ideals of the ring (in fact, it is the intersection of all minimal prime ideals).

Proposition— Let $R$ be a commutative ring. Then the nilradical $\mathfrak{N}_R$ of $R$ equals the intersection of all prime ideals of $R.$

Proof

Firstly, the nilradical is contained in every prime ideal. Indeed, if $a\in \mathfrak{N}_R,$ one has $a^n=0$ for some positive integer $n.$ Since every ideal contains 0 and every prime ideal that contains a product, here $a^n=0,$ contains one of its factors, one deduces that every prime ideal contains $a.$

Conversely, let $f\notin\mathfrak{N}_R;$ we have to prove that there is a prime ideal that does not contain $f.$ Consider the set $\Sigma$ of all ideals that do not contain any power of $f.$ One has $(0) \in \Sigma,$ by definition of the nilradical. For every chain $J_1\subseteq J_2 \subseteq \dots$ of ideals in $\Sigma,$ it is easy to check that the union $J=\bigcup_{i\geq1} J_i$ is an ideal. Moreover, $J$ belongs to $\Sigma,$ since otherwise it would contain a power of $f,$ which must belong to some $J_i,$ contradicting the definition of $J_i.$

So, $\Sigma$ is a (nonempty) partially ordered set by set inclusion such that every chain in $\Sigma$ has a upper bound in $\Sigma$. Thus, Zorn's lemma applies, and there exists a maximal element $\mathfrak{m} \in \Sigma$. We have to prove that $\mathfrak{m}$ is a prime ideal. If it were not prime there would be two elements $g\in R$ and $h\in R$ such that $g\notin\mathfrak{m},$ $h\notin\mathfrak{m},$ and $gh\in\mathfrak{m}$. By maximality of $\mathfrak{m},$ one has $\mathfrak{m}+(g)\notin\Sigma$ and $\mathfrak{m}+(h)\notin\Sigma.$ So there exist positive integers $r$ and $s$ such that $f^r \in \mathfrak{m}+(g)$ and $f^s \in \mathfrak{m}+(h).$ It follows that $f^rf^s=f^{r+s} \in \mathfrak{m}+(gh)=\mathfrak{m},$ contradicting the fact that $\mathfrak{m}$ is in $\Sigma$. This finishes the proof, since we have proved the existence of a prime ideal that does not contain $f.$

A ring is called reduced if it has no nonzero nilpotent elements. Thus, a ring is reduced if and only if its nilradical is zero. If R is an arbitrary commutative ring, then the quotient of it by the nilradical is a reduced ring and is denoted by $R_{\text{red}}$.

Since every maximal ideal is a prime ideal, the Jacobson radical — which is the intersection of maximal ideals — must contain the nilradical. A ring R is called a Jacobson ring if the nilradical and Jacobson radical of R/P coincide for all prime ideals P of R. An Artinian ring is Jacobson, and its nilradical is the maximal nilpotent ideal of the ring. In general, if the nilradical is finitely generated (i.e., the ring is Noetherian), then it is nilpotent.

== Noncommutative rings ==
For noncommutative rings, there are several analogues of the nilradical. The lower nilradical (or Baer–McCoy radical, or prime radical) is the analogue of the radical of the zero ideal and is defined as the intersection of the prime ideals of the ring. The analogue of the set of all nilpotent elements is the upper nilradical and is defined as the ideal generated by all nil ideals of the ring, which is itself a nil ideal. The set of all nilpotent elements itself need not be an ideal (or even a subgroup), so the upper nilradical can be much smaller than this set. The Levitzki radical is in between and is defined as the largest locally nilpotent ideal. As in the commutative case, when the ring is Artinian, the Levitzki radical is nilpotent and so is the unique largest nilpotent ideal. Indeed, if the ring is merely Noetherian, then the lower, upper, and Levitzki radical are nilpotent and coincide, allowing the nilradical of any Noetherian ring to be defined as the unique largest (left, right, or two-sided) nilpotent ideal of the ring.
