= Generic matrix ring =

In algebra, a generic matrix ring is a sort of a universal matrix ring.

== Definition ==
We denote by $F_n$ a generic matrix ring of size n with variables $X_1, \dots X_m$. It is characterized by the universal property: given a commutative ring R and n-by-n matrices $A_1, \dots, A_m$ over R, there exists a unique ring homomorphism (called the evaluation map) $F_n \to M_n(R)$ extending the assignment $X_i \mapsto A_i$.

Explicitly, given a field k, it is the subalgebra $F_n$ of the matrix ring $M_n(k[(X_l)_{ij} \mid 1 \le l \le m,\ 1 \le i, j \le n])$ generated by n-by-n matrices $X_1, \dots, X_m$, where $(X_l)_{ij}$ are matrix entries and commute by definition. For example, if m = 1 then $F_1$ is a polynomial ring in one variable.

For example, a central polynomial is an element of the ring $F_n$ that will map to a central element under an evaluation. (In fact, it is in the invariant ring $k[(X_l)_{ij}]^{\operatorname{GL}_n(k)}$ since it is central and invariant.)

By definition, $F_n$ is a quotient of the free ring $k\langle t_1, \dots, t_m \rangle$ with $t_i \mapsto X_i$ by the ideal consisting of all p that vanish identically on all n-by-n matrices over k.

== Geometric perspective ==
The universal property means that any ring homomorphism from $k\langle t_1, \dots, t_m \rangle$ to a matrix ring factors through $F_n$. This has a following geometric meaning. In algebraic geometry, the polynomial ring $k[t, \dots, t_m]$ is the coordinate ring of the affine space $k^m$, and to give a point of $k^m$ is to give a ring homomorphism (evaluation) $k[t, \dots, t_m] \to k$ (either by Hilbert's Nullstellensatz or by the scheme theory). The free ring $k\langle t_1, \dots, t_m \rangle$ plays the role of the coordinate ring of the affine space in the noncommutative algebraic geometry (i.e., we don't demand free variables to commute) and thus a generic matrix ring of size n is the coordinate ring of a noncommutative affine variety whose points are the Spec's of matrix rings of size n (see below for a more concrete discussion.)

=== The maximal spectrum of a generic matrix ring ===
For simplicity, assume k is algebraically closed. Let A be an algebra over k and let $\operatorname{Spec}_n(A)$ denote the set of all maximal ideals $\mathfrak{m}$ in A such that $A/\mathfrak{m} \approx M_n(k)$. If A is commutative, then $\operatorname{Spec}_1(A)$ is the maximal spectrum of A and $\operatorname{Spec}_n(A)$ is empty for any $n > 1$.
