= Polynomial identity ring =

In ring theory, a branch of mathematics, a ring R is a polynomial identity ring if there is, for some N > 0, an element P ≠ 0 of the free algebra, Z⟨X_{1}, X_{2}, ..., X_{N}⟩, over the ring of integers in N variables X_{1}, X_{2}, ..., X_{N} such that

$$P(r_1, r_2, \ldots, r_N) = 0$$

for all N-tuples r_{1}, r_{2}, ..., r_{N} taken from R.

Strictly the X_{i} here are "non-commuting indeterminates", and so "polynomial identity" is a slight abuse of language, since "polynomial" here stands for what is usually called a "non-commutative polynomial". The abbreviation PI-ring is common. More generally, the free algebra over any ring S may be used, and gives the concept of PI-algebra.

If the degree of the polynomial P is defined in the usual way, the polynomial P is called monic if at least one of its terms of highest degree has coefficient equal to 1.

Every commutative ring is a PI-ring, satisfying the polynomial identity XY − YX = 0. Therefore, PI-rings are usually taken as close generalizations of commutative rings. If the ring has characteristic p different from zero then it satisfies the polynomial identity pX = 0. To exclude such examples, sometimes it is defined that PI-rings must satisfy a monic polynomial identity.

== Examples ==
- For example, if R is a commutative ring it is a PI-ring: this is true with

$$P(X_1,X_2) = X_1X_2-X_2X_1 = 0~$$

- The ring of 2 × 2 matrices over a commutative ring satisfies the Hall identity

$$(xy-yx)^2z=z(xy-yx)^2$$

This identity was used by M. Hall (1943), but was found earlier by Wagner (1937).

- A major role is played in the theory by the standard identity s_{N}, of length N, which generalises the example given for commutative rings (N = 2). It derives from the Leibniz formula for determinants

$$\det(A) = \sum_{\sigma \in S_N} \sgn(\sigma) \prod_{i = 1}^N a_{i,\sigma(i)}$$

by replacing each product in the summand by the product of the X_{i} in the order given by the permutation σ. In other words each of the N! orders is summed, and the coefficient is 1 or −1 according to the signature.

$$s_N(X_1,\ldots,X_N) = \sum_{\sigma \in S_N} \sgn(\sigma) X_{\sigma(1)}\dotsm X_{\sigma(N)}=0~$$

The m × m matrix ring over any commutative ring satisfies a standard identity: the Amitsur–Levitzki theorem states that it satisfies s_{2m}. The degree of this identity is optimal since the matrix ring can not satisfy any monic polynomial of degree less than 2m.

- Given a field k of characteristic zero, take R to be the exterior algebra over a countably infinite-dimensional vector space with basis e_{1}, e_{2}, e_{3}, ... Then R is generated by the elements of this basis and

e_{i} e_{j} = −e_{j} e_{i}.

This ring does not satisfy s_{N} for any N and therefore can not be embedded in any matrix ring. In fact s_{N}(e_{1},e_{2},...,e_{N}) = N!e_{1}e_{2}...e_{N} ≠ 0. On the other hand it is a PI-ring since it satisfies [[x, y], z] := xyz − yxz − zxy + zyx = 0. It is enough to check this for monomials in the e_{i}'s. Now, a monomial of even degree commutes with every element. Therefore if either x or y is a monomial of even degree [x, y] := xy − yx = 0. If both are of odd degree then [x, y] = xy − yx = 2xy has even degree and therefore commutes with z, i.e. [[x, y], z] = 0.

== Properties ==
- Any subring or homomorphic image of a PI-ring is a PI-ring.
- A finite direct product of PI-rings is a PI-ring.
- A direct product of PI-rings, satisfying the same identity, is a PI-ring.
- It can always be assumed that the identity that the PI-ring satisfies is multilinear.
- If a ring is finitely generated by n elements as a module over its center then it satisfies every alternating multilinear polynomial of degree larger than n. In particular it satisfies s_{N} for N > n and therefore it is a PI-ring.
- If R and S are PI-rings then their tensor product over the integers, $R\otimes_\mathbb{Z}S$, is also a PI-ring.
- If R is a PI-ring, then so is the ring of n × n matrices with coefficients in R.

== PI-rings as generalizations of commutative rings ==
Among non-commutative rings, PI-rings satisfy the Köthe conjecture. Affine PI-algebras over a field satisfy the Kurosh conjecture, the Nullstellensatz and the catenary property for prime ideals.

If R is a PI-ring and K is a subring of its center such that R is integral over K then the going up and going down properties for prime ideals of R and K are satisfied. Also the lying over property (If p is a prime ideal of K then there is a prime ideal P of R such that $p$ is minimal over $P\cap K$) and the incomparability property (If P and Q are prime ideals of R and $P\subset Q$ then $P\cap K\subset Q\cap K$) are satisfied.

== The set of identities a PI-ring satisfies ==
If F := Z⟨X_{1}, X_{2}, ..., X_{N}⟩ is the free algebra in N variables and R is a PI-ring satisfying the polynomial P in N variables, then P is in the kernel of any homomorphism

$\tau$: F $\rightarrow$ R.

An ideal I of F is called T-ideal if $f(I)\subset I$ for every endomorphism f of F.

Given a PI-ring, R, the set of all polynomial identities it satisfies is an ideal but even more it is a T-ideal. Conversely, if I is a T-ideal of F then F/I is a PI-ring satisfying all identities in I. It is assumed that I contains monic polynomials when PI-rings are required to satisfy monic polynomial identities.

== See also ==
- Posner's theorem
- Central polynomial
