= Nilpotent =

Element in a ring whose some power is 0

In mathematics, an element $x$ of a ring $R$ is called nilpotent if there exists some positive integer $n$ such that $x^n=0$. The smallest such $n$ is called the index of nilpotency or the degree of nilpotency of $x$.

The term, along with its sister idempotent, was introduced by Benjamin Peirce in the context of his work on the classification of algebras.

== Examples ==
- This definition can be applied in particular to square matrices. The matrix

$$A = \begin{pmatrix}
0 & 1 & 0\\
0 & 0 & 1\\
0 & 0 & 0
\end{pmatrix}$$

is nilpotent because $A^3=0$. See nilpotent matrix for more.

- In the factor ring $\Z/9\Z$, the equivalence class of 3 is nilpotent because 3^{2} is congruent to 0 modulo 9.
- Assume that two elements $a$ and $b$ in a ring $R$ satisfy $ab=0$. Then the element $c=ba$ is nilpotent as
  $$\begin{align}c^2&=(ba)^2\\
&=b(ab)a\\
&=0.\\
\end{align}$$
  An example with matrices (for a, b):
  $$A = \begin{pmatrix}
0 & 1\\
0 & 1
\end{pmatrix}, \;\;
B =\begin{pmatrix}
0 & 1\\
0 & 0
\end{pmatrix}.$$
  Here $AB=0$ and $BA=B$.
- By definition, any element of a nilsemigroup is nilpotent.

== Properties ==
No nilpotent element can be a unit (except in the trivial ring, which has only a single element 0 = 1). All nilpotent elements are zero divisors.

An $n\times n$ matrix $A$ with entries from a field is nilpotent if and only if its characteristic polynomial is $t^n$.

If $x$ is nilpotent, then $1-x$ is a unit, because $x^n=0$ entails
$$(1 - x) (1 + x + x^2 + \cdots + x^{n-1}) = 1 - x^n = 1.$$

More generally, the sum of a unit element and a nilpotent element is a unit when they commute.

== Commutative rings ==
The nilpotent elements from a commutative ring $R$ form an ideal $\mathfrak{N}$; this is a consequence of the binomial theorem. This ideal is the nilradical of the ring. If $\mathfrak{N}=\{0\}$, i.e., $R$ has no non-zero nilpotent elements, $R$ is called a reduced ring.

Every nilpotent element $x$ in a commutative ring is contained in every prime ideal $\mathfrak{p}$ of that ring, since $x^n = 0\in \mathfrak{p}$. So $\mathfrak{N}$ is contained in the intersection of all prime ideals. Conversely, if $x$ is not nilpotent, we are able to localize with respect to the powers of $x$: $S=\{1,x,x^2,...\}$ to get a non-zero ring $S^{-1}R$. The prime ideals of the localized ring correspond exactly to those prime ideals $\mathfrak{p}$ of $R$ with $\mathfrak{p}\cap S=\empty$. As every non-zero commutative ring has a maximal ideal, which is prime, every non-nilpotent $x$ is not contained in some prime ideal. Thus $\mathfrak{N}$ is exactly the intersection of all prime ideals.

A characteristic similar to that of Jacobson radical and annihilation of simple modules is available for nilradical: nilpotent elements of a ring $R$ are precisely those that annihilate all integral domains internal to the ring $R$ (that is, of the form $R/I$ for prime ideals $I$). This follows from the fact that nilradical is the intersection of all prime ideals.

== Nilpotent elements in Lie algebra ==
Let $\mathfrak{g}$ be a Lie algebra. Then an element $x\in\mathfrak{g}$ is called nilpotent if it is in the commutator subalgebra $[\mathfrak{g}, \mathfrak{g}]$ and $\operatorname{ad} x$ is a nilpotent transformation. See also: Jordan decomposition in a Lie algebra.

== Nilpotency in physics ==
Any ladder operator in a finite dimensional space is nilpotent. They represent creation and annihilation operators, which transform from one state to another, for example the raising and lowering Pauli matrices $\sigma_\pm=(\sigma_x\pm i \sigma_y)/2$.

An operand $Q$ that satisfies $Q^2=0$ is nilpotent. Grassmann numbers which allow a path integral representation for Fermionic fields are nilpotents since their squares vanish. The BRST charge is an important example in physics.

As linear operators form an associative algebra and thus a ring, this is a special case of the initial definition. More generally, in view of the above definitions, an operator $Q$ is nilpotent if there is $n\in\N$ such that $Q^n=0$ (the zero function). Thus, a linear map is nilpotent iff it has a nilpotent matrix in some basis. Another example for this is the exterior derivative (again with $n=2$). Both are linked, also through supersymmetry and Morse theory, as shown by Edward Witten in a celebrated article.

The electromagnetic field of a plane wave without sources is nilpotent when it is expressed in terms of the algebra of physical space. More generally, the technique of microadditivity (which can used to derive theorems in physics) makes use of nilpotent or nilsquare infinitesimals and is part of smooth infinitesimal analysis.

== Algebraic nilpotents ==
The two-dimensional dual numbers contain a nilpotent space. Other algebras and numbers that contain nilpotent spaces include split-quaternions (coquaternions), split-octonions, biquaternions $\mathbb C\otimes\mathbb H$, and complex octonions $\mathbb C\otimes\mathbb O$. If a nilpotent infinitesimal is a variable tending to zero, it can be shown that any sum of terms for which it is the subject is an indefinitely small proportion of the first order term.

== See also ==
- Idempotent element (ring theory)
- Unipotent
- Nil ideal
