= Jeremy Gunawardena =

American mathematician and systems biologist

- Born: November 1955 (age 70)
- Education: University of Cambridge (Ph.D.)
- Known for: Little b linear framework
- Scientific career
- Fields: Systems biology, Mathematical biology, Algebraic topology
- Workplaces: Harvard

Jeremy Gunawardena (born November 1955) is a mathematician and systems biologist who is a Distinguished Professor at the Universitat Pompeu Fabra in Barcelona, Spain. His lab focuses on cellular learning and information processing.

== Education ==
Gunawardena received a BSc degree in mathematics from Imperial College, London, where he was awarded the Sir John Lubbock Memorial Prize for the highest-ranked first class degree in the University of London. He did Part III of the Mathematical Tripos at Trinity College, Cambridge, for which he was awarded a J T Knight Prize in Class 1, and went on to do his PhD in algebraic topology with Frank Adams at Cambridge.

== Career ==
He was elected to a research fellowship in Pure Mathematics at Trinity College. Before taking up his Fellowship, he spent two years as L.E. Dickson Instructor in the Department of Mathematics at the University of Chicago. He subsequently spent several years in industrial research at HP Labs in Bristol, UK. He also served as a Member of Council of the UK's Engineering and Physical Sciences Research Council (EPSRC). In 2002, Gunawardena become a Visiting Scientist at the Bauer Center for Genomics Research at Harvard. In 2003, he joined the newly formed Department of Systems Biology at Harvard Medical School. In 2025, he moved to the Universitat Pompeo Fabra as a Distinguished Professor.

== Work ==
Gunawardena's PhD thesis led to the solution, with Frank Adams and Haynes Miller, of the Segal conjecture for elementary abelian groups, which provided the algebraic starting point for Gunnar Carlsson's solution of the full conjecture. At the University of Chicago, he helped to set up the first computer science courses at the University. At HP Labs, Gunawardena created the Basic Research Institute in the Mathematical Sciences (BRIMS), a pioneering academic-industrial partnership with the University of Bristol and the Isaac Newton Institute for Mathematical Sciences in Cambridge.

One of his most cited papers, "Multisite protein phosphorylation makes a good threshold but can be a poor switch" in Proceedings of the National Academy of Sciences, has received 280 citations according to Google Scholar.

Gunawardena introduced, with Aneil Mallavarapu, the programming-with-models approach to virtual cells, which led to the programming language little b.Together with Marc Kirschner, Lew Cantley, Walter Fontana and Johan Paulsson, he helped set up and co-taught Systems Biology 200, one of the first courses to discuss the core mathematical ideas needed in systems biology. He also founded the weekly series of Theory Lunch chalk talks, which has been running since 2003 and has brought some of the culture of the mathematical sciences into systems biology.

At Harvard Medical School, Gunawardena's lab studies information processing in eukaryotic cells, with a focus on mechanisms like post-translational modification, gene regulation and allostery. Gunawardena has had a long-standing interest in the interface between mathematics and biology, on which he has written several perspectives. Gunawardena's essay, "Models in biology: 'accurate descriptions of our pathetic thinking'," published in BMC Biology, critiques the limitations of mathematical models in biological research. He argues that many models fail to accurately represent nature and emphasizes the importance of verifiability and falsifiability in their components and conclusions.

Gunawardena's lab has developed over several years a mathematical approach for analyzing biomolecular systems called the 'linear framework in which theorems can be proved about biological processes.

Gunawardena has been exploring the concept of cellular learning, bringing ideas from cognitive science and psychology to bear on the behavior of individual cells. He was awarded a European Research Council synergy grant to study this, 'CeLEARN: learning in single cells through dynamical internal representations', together with Aneta Koseska, Dietmar Schmucker and Jordi Garcia-Ojalvo.

== Selected publications ==
- Gunawardena, Jeremy (2014-04-30). "Models in biology: 'accurate descriptions of our pathetic thinking'". BMC Biology. 12 (1): 29. doi:10.1186/1741-7007-12-29. ISSN 1741-7007. PMC 4005397. PMID 24886484.
- Gunawardena, Jeremy (2013). "Biology is more theoretical than physics". Molecular Biology of the Cell. 24 (12): 1827–1829. doi:10.1091/mbc.E12-03-0227. ISSN 1939-4586. PMC 3681688. PMID 23765269.
- Gunawardena, Jeremy (2012-02-15). "Some lessons about models from Michaelis and Menten". Molecular Biology of the Cell. 23 (4): 517–519. doi:10.1091/mbc.e11-07-0643. ISSN 1059-1524. PMC 3279381. PMID 22337858.
- Nam, Kee-Myoung; Gunawardena, Jeremy (2023-11-03). "The linear framework II: using graph theory to analyse the transient regime of Markov processes". Frontiers in Cell and Developmental Biology. 11. doi:10.3389/fcell.2023.1233808. ISSN 2296-634X. PMC 10656611. PMID 38020901.
- Nam, Kee-Myoung; Martinez-Corral, Rosa; Gunawardena, Jeremy (2022-08-06). "The linear framework: using graph theory to reveal the algebra and thermodynamics of biomolecular systems". Interface Focus. 12 (4). doi:10.1098/rsfs.2022.0013. ISSN 2042-8901. PMC 9184966. PMID 35860006.
- Gunawardena, Jeremy (2012-05-14). "A Linear Framework for Time-Scale Separation in Nonlinear Biochemical Systems". PLOS ONE. 7 (5) e36321. doi:10.1371/journal.pone.0036321. ISSN 1932-6203. PMC 3351455. PMID 22606254.
- Gershman, Samuel J; Balbi, Petra EM; Gallistel, C Randy; Gunawardena, Jeremy (2021-01-04). "Reconsidering the evidence for learning in single cells". eLife. 10 e61907. doi:10.7554/eLife.61907. ISSN 2050-084X. PMC 7781593. PMID 33395388.
- Gunawardena, Jeremy (2022). "Learning Outside the Brain: Integrating Cognitive Science and Systems Biology". Proceedings of the IEEE. 110 (5): 590–612. doi:10.1109/JPROC.2022.3162791.
- Estrada, Javier; Wong, Felix; DePace, Angela; Gunawardena, Jeremy (2016). "Information Integration and Energy Expenditure in Gene Regulation". Cell. 166 (1): 234–244. doi:10.1016/j.cell.2016.06.012. PMC 4930556. PMID 27368104.
