= Category algebra =

In category theory, a field of mathematics, a category algebra is an associative algebra, defined for any locally finite category and commutative ring with unity. Category algebras generalize the notions of group algebras and incidence algebras, just as categories generalize the notions of groups and partially ordered sets.

== Definition ==
If the given category is finite (has finitely many objects and morphisms), then the following two definitions of the category algebra agree.

=== Group algebra-style definition ===
Given a group G and a commutative ring R, one can construct RG, known as the group algebra; it is an R-module equipped with a multiplication. A group is the same as a category with a single object in which all morphisms are isomorphisms (where the elements of the group correspond to the morphisms of the category), so the following construction generalizes the definition of the group algebra from groups to arbitrary categories.

Let C be a category and R be a commutative ring with unity. Define RC (or R[C]) to be the free R-module with the set $\operatorname{Hom}C$ of morphisms of C as its basis. In other words, RC consists of formal linear combinations (which are finite sums) of the form $\sum a_i f_i$, where f_{i} are morphisms of C, and a_{i} are elements of the ring R. Define a multiplication operation on RC as follows, using the composition operation in the category:

$$\sum a_i f_i \sum b_j g_j = \sum a_i b_j f_i g_j$$

where $f_i g_j=0$ if their composition is not defined. This defines a binary operation on RC, and moreover makes RC into an associative algebra over the ring R. This algebra is called the category algebra of C.

From a different perspective, elements of the free module RC could also be considered as functions from the morphisms of C to R which are finitely supported. Then the multiplication is described by a convolution: if $a, b \in RC$ (thought of as functionals on the morphisms of C), then their product is defined as:

$$(a * b)(h) := \sum_{fg=h} a(f)b(g).$$

The latter sum is finite because the functions are finitely supported, and therefore $a * b \in RC$.

=== Incidence algebra-style definition ===
The definition used for incidence algebras assumes that the category C is locally finite (see below), is dual to the above definition, and defines a different object. This isn't a useful assumption for groups, as a group that is locally finite as a category is finite.

A locally finite category is one where every morphism can be written in only finitely many ways as the composition of two non-identity morphisms (not to be confused with the "has finite Hom-sets" meaning). The category algebra (in this sense) is defined as above, but allowing all coefficients to be non-zero.

In terms of formal sums, the elements are all formal sums

$$\sum_{f_i \in \operatorname{Hom}C} a_i f_i,$$

where there are no restrictions on the $a_i$ (they can all be non-zero).

In terms of functions, the elements are any functions from the morphisms of C to R, and multiplication is defined as convolution. The sum in the convolution is always finite because of the local finiteness assumption.

=== Dual ===
The module dual of the category algebra (in the group algebra sense of the definition) is the space of all maps from the morphisms of C to R, denoted F(C), and has a natural coalgebra structure. Thus for a locally finite category, the dual of a category algebra (in the group algebra sense) is the category algebra (in the incidence algebra sense), and has both an algebra and coalgebra structure.

== Examples ==
- If C is a group (thought of as a groupoid with a single object), then RC is the group algebra.
- If C is a monoid (thought of as a category with a single object), then RC is the monoid ring.
- If C is a partially ordered set, then (using the appropriate definition), RC is the incidence algebra.
- While partial orders only allow for viewing upper or lower triangular matrices as incidence algebras, the concept of category algebras also encompasses the ring of matrices of R. Indeed, if C is the preorder on n points where every point has a relation to every other (a complete graph), then RC is the matrix ring $R^{n \times n}$.
- If C is a discrete category, then RC may be seen as the ring of functions $C \rightarrow R$ with pointwise addition and multiplication, or equivalently the direct product of copies of R indexed over C. In the case of infinite C, one needs to distinguish the "group algebra-style" and the "incidence algebra-style", because in the former, one only allows for finitely many terms in the formal linear combination, resulting in RC being instead the direct sum of copies of R.
- The path algebra of a quiver Q is the category algebra of the free category on Q.
