= Gunnar Carlsson =

Mathematician

Gunnar E. Carlsson
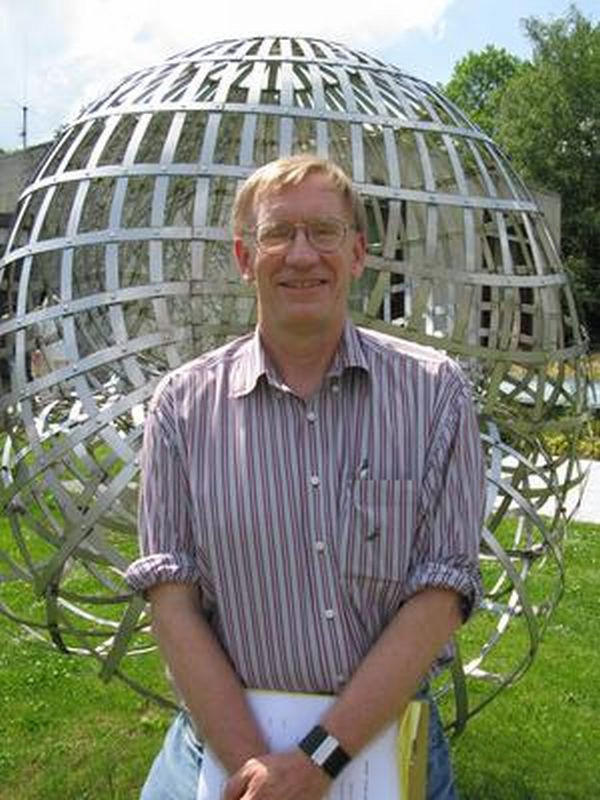
- Born: 22 August 1952 (age 74); Stockholm, Sweden
- Education: Stanford University; Harvard University
- Known for: Segal conjecture Topological data analysis
- Awards: Alfred P. Sloan fellow
- Scientific career
- Fields: Mathematics
- Workplaces: Stanford University; University of Chicago; University of California, San Diego; Princeton University
- Doctoral advisor: R. James (Richard) Milgram
- Doctoral students: Kirsten Wickelgren; Reza Zadeh

Gunnar E. Carlsson (born August 22, 1952 in Stockholm, Sweden) is an American mathematician, working in algebraic topology. He is known for his work on the Segal conjecture, and for his work on applied algebraic topology, especially topological data analysis. He is a Professor Emeritus in the Department of Mathematics at Stanford University. He is the founder and president of the predictive technology company Ayasdi.

== Biography ==
Carlsson was born in Sweden and was educated in the United States. He graduated from Redwood High School (Larkspur, California) in 1969. He received a Ph.D. from Stanford University in 1976, with a dissertation written under the supervision of R. J. Milgram. He was a Dickson Assistant Professor at the University of Chicago (1976-1978) and Professor at the University of California, San Diego (1978–86), Princeton University (1986-1991), and Stanford University (1991–2015) where he held the Anne and Bill Swindells Professorship and was Chair of the Department of Mathematics from 1995 to 1998.

He was an Ordway Visiting Professor at the University of Minnesota (May–June 1991) and held a Sloan Foundation Research Fellowship (1984-1986). He has delivered an invited address at the International Congress of Mathematicians in Berkeley, California, in 1986; a plenary address at the annual meeting of the American Mathematical Society (1984); the Whittaker Colloquium at the University of Edinburgh (2011); the Rademacher Lectures at the University of Pennsylvania (2011); and an invited plenary address at the annual meeting of the Society of Industrial and Applied Mathematics (2012). He was elected as a member of the 2017 class of Fellows of the American Mathematical Society "for contributions to algebraic topology, particularly equivariant stable homotopy theory, algebraic K-theory, and applied algebraic topology".

In 2008, Carlsson cofounded Ayasdi, a predictive technology based on big data, machine learning and artificial intelligence.

== Work ==
=== Equivariant methods in homotopy theory ===
Segal's Burnside conjecture provides a description of the stable cohomotopy theory of the classifying space of a finite group. It is the analogue for cohomotopy of the work of Michael Atiyah and Graeme Segal on the K-theory of these classifying spaces. Building on earlier work by Frank Adams, Jeremy Gunawardena, Haynes Miller, J. Peter May, James McClure, and L. Gaunce Lewis, Carlsson proved this conjecture in 1982. He also adapted the techniques to provide a proof of Sullivan's fixed point conjecture, which was also proved simultaneously and independently by Miller and Jean Lannes.

=== Algebraic K-theory ===
Algebraic K-theory is a topological construction that assigns spaces (ultimately spectra) to rings, schemes, and other non-topological input. It has connections with important questions in high-dimensional topology, notably the conjectures of Novikov and Borel. Carlsson has proved, jointly with E. Pedersen and B. Goldfarb Novikov's conjecture for large classes of groups.

=== Applied and computational topology ===
Carlsson has worked in computational topology, especially as it applies to the analysis of high dimensional and complex data sets. In collaboration with others, he has demonstrated the utility of both persistent homology and the Mapper methodology in a series of papers. This work is central to the development of tools by Ayasdi, Inc, for analyzing massive and complex data sets across multiple application domains. In January 2016, he published a topological data analysis on the Donald Trump presidential campaign, 2016 and was able to outline the reach potential of Trump's messages in the mind of skeptical voters.

== Private life ==
Carlsson is married and has three children.
