= Atiyah–Segal completion theorem =

Mathematical result about equivariant K-theory in homotopy theory

The Atiyah–Segal completion theorem is a theorem in mathematics about equivariant K-theory in homotopy theory. Let G be a compact Lie group and let X be a G-CW-complex. The theorem then states that the projection map

$$\pi\colon X\times EG\to X$$

induces an isomorphism of prorings

$$\pi^*\colon K_G^*(X)_{\widehat{I\,}} \to K^*((X\times EG)/G).$$

Here, the induced map has as domain the completion of the G-equivariant K-theory of X with respect to I, where I denotes the augmentation ideal of the representation ring of G.

In the special case of X being a point, the theorem specializes to give an isomorphism $K^*(BG)\cong R(G)_{\widehat{I\,}}$ between the K-theory of the classifying space of G and the completion of the representation ring.

The theorem can be interpreted as giving a comparison between the geometrical process of taking the homotopy quotient of a G-space, by making the action free before passing to the quotient, and the algebraic process of completing with respect to an ideal.

The theorem was first proved for finite groups by Michael Atiyah in 1961, and a proof of the general case was published by Atiyah together with Graeme Segal in 1969. Different proofs have since appeared generalizing the theorem to completion with respect to families of subgroups. The corresponding statement for algebraic K-theory was proven by Alexander Merkurjev, holding in the case that the group is algebraic over the complex numbers.

== See also ==
- Segal conjecture
