= Graph algebra =

In mathematics, especially in the fields of universal algebra and graph theory, a graph algebra is a way of giving a directed graph an algebraic structure. It was introduced by McNulty and Shallon, and has seen many uses in the field of universal algebra since then.

== Definition ==
Let D = (V, E) be a directed graph, and 0 an element not in V. The graph algebra associated with D has underlying set $V \cup \{0\}$, and is equipped with a multiplication defined by the rules

- xy = x if $x,y \in V$ and $(x,y) \in E$,
- xy = 0 if $x,y \in V \cup \{0\}$ and $(x,y)\notin E$.

== Applications ==
This notion has made it possible to use the methods of graph theory in universal algebra and several other areas of discrete mathematics and computer science. Graph algebras have been used, for example, in constructions concerning dualities, equational theories, flatness, groupoid rings, topologies, varieties, finite-state machines, tree languages and tree automata, etc.

== See also ==
- Group algebra (disambiguation)
- Incidence algebra
- Path algebra

== Works cited ==
- Davey, Brian A.; Idziak, Pawel M.; Lampe, William A.; McNulty, George F. (2000). "Dualizability and graph algebras". Discrete Mathematics. 214 (1): 145–172. doi:10.1016/S0012-365X(99)00225-3. ISSN 0012-365X. MR 1743633.
- Delić, Dejan (2001). "Finite bases for flat graph algebras". Journal of Algebra. 246 (1): 453–469. doi:10.1006/jabr.2001.8947. ISSN 0021-8693. MR 1872631.
- Kelarev, A.V.; Miller, M.; Sokratova, O.V. (2005). "Languages recognized by two-sided automata of graphs". Proc. Estonian Akademy of Science. 54 (1): 46–54. ISSN 1736-6046. MR 2126358.
- Kelarev, A.V.; Sokratova, O.V. (2001). "Directed graphs and syntactic algebras of tree languages". J. Automata, Languages & Combinatorics. 6 (3): 305–311. ISSN 1430-189X. MR 1879773.
- Kelarev, A.V.; Sokratova, O.V. (2003). "On congruences of automata defined by directed graphs" (PDF). Theoretical Computer Science. 301 (1–3): 31–43. doi:10.1016/S0304-3975(02)00544-3. ISSN 0304-3975. MR 1975219.
- Lee, S.-M. (1988). "Graph algebras which admit only discrete topologies". Congr. Numer. 64: 147–156. ISSN 1736-6046. MR 0988675.
- Lee, S.-M. (1991). "Simple graph algebras and simple rings". Southeast Asian Bull. Math. 15 (2): 117–121. ISSN 0129-2021. MR 1145431.
- McNulty, George F.; Shallon, Caroline R. (1983). "Inherently nonfinitely based finite algebras". In Freese, Ralph S.; Garcia, Octavio C. (eds.). Universal algebra and lattice theory (Puebla, 1982). Lecture Notes in Math. Vol. 1004. Berlin, New York City: Springer-Verlag. pp. 206–231. doi:10.1007/BFb0063439. hdl:10338.dmlcz/102157. ISBN 978-354012329-3. MR 0716184 – via Internet Archive.
- Oates-Williams, Sheila (1984). "On the variety generated by Murskiĭ's algebra". Algebra Universalis. 18 (2): 175–177. doi:10.1007/BF01198526. ISSN 0002-5240. MR 0743465. S2CID 121598599.
- Pöschel, R. (1989). "The equational logic for graph algebras". Z. Math. Logik Grundlag. Math. 35 (3): 273–282. doi:10.1002/malq.19890350311. MR 1000970.
