= Monoid ring =

Algebraic structure

In abstract algebra, a monoid ring is a ring constructed from a ring and a monoid, just as a group ring is constructed from a ring and a group.

== Definition ==
Let R be a ring and let G be a monoid. The monoid ring or monoid algebra of G over R, denoted R[G] or RG, is the set of formal sums $\sum_{g \in G} r_g g$, where $r_g \in R$ for each $g \in G$ and r_{g} = 0 for all but finitely many g, equipped with coefficient-wise addition, and the multiplication in which the elements of R commute with the elements of G. More formally, R[G] is the free R-module on the set G, endowed with R-linear multiplication defined on the base elements by g·h := gh, where the left-hand side is understood as the multiplication in R[G] and the right-hand side is understood in G.

Alternatively, one can identify the element $g \in R[G]$ with the function e_{g} that maps g to 1 and every other element of G to 0. This way, R[G] is identified with the set of functions φ: G → R such that {g : φ(g) ≠ 0} is finite. equipped with addition of functions, and with multiplication defined by

$$(\phi \psi)(g) = \sum_{k\ell=g} \phi(k) \psi(\ell)$$.

If G is a group, then R[G] is also called the group ring of G over R.

== Universal property ==
Given R and G, there is a ring homomorphism α: R → R[G] sending each r to r1 (where 1 is the identity element of G), and a monoid homomorphism β: G → R[G] (where the latter is viewed as a monoid under multiplication) sending each g to 1g (where 1 is the multiplicative identity of R). We have that α(r) commutes with β(g) for all r in R and g in G.

The universal property of the monoid ring states that given a ring S, a ring homomorphism α': R → S, and a monoid homomorphism β': G → S to the multiplicative monoid of S, such that α'(r) commutes with β'(g) for all r in R and g in G, there is a unique ring homomorphism γ: R[G] → S such that composing α and β with γ produces α' and β '.

== Augmentation ==
The augmentation is the ring homomorphism η: R[G] → R defined by

$$\eta\left(\sum_{g\in G} r_g g\right) = \sum_{g\in G} r_g.$$

The kernel of η is called the augmentation ideal. It is a free R-module with basis consisting of 1 – g for all g in G not equal to 1.

== Examples ==
Given a ring R and the (additive) monoid of natural numbers N (or {x^{n}} viewed multiplicatively), we obtain the ring R[{x^{n}}] =: R[x] of polynomials over R. The monoid N^{n} (with the addition) gives the polynomial ring with n variables: R[N^{n}] =: R[X_{1}, ..., X_{n}].

== Generalization ==
If G is a semigroup, the same construction yields a semigroup ring R[G].

== See also ==
- Free algebra
- Puiseux series
