= Sullivan conjecture =

Mathematical conjecture

In mathematics, Sullivan conjecture or Sullivan's conjecture on maps from classifying spaces can refer to any of several results and conjectures prompted by homotopy theory work of Dennis Sullivan. A basic theme and motivation concerns the fixed point set in group actions of a finite group $G$. The most elementary formulation, however, is in terms of the classifying space $BG$ of such a group. Roughly speaking, it is difficult to map such a space $BG$ continuously into a finite CW complex $X$ in a non-trivial manner. Such a version of the Sullivan conjecture was first proved by Haynes Miller. Specifically, in 1984, Miller proved that the function space, carrying the compact-open topology, of base point-preserving mappings from $BG$ to $X$ is weakly contractible.

This is equivalent to the statement that the map $X$ → $F(BG, X)$ from X to the function space of maps $BG$ → $X$, not necessarily preserving the base point, given by sending a point $x$ of $X$ to the constant map whose image is $x$ is a weak equivalence. The mapping space $F(BG, X)$ is an example of a homotopy fixed point set. Specifically, $F(BG, X)$ is the homotopy fixed point set of the group $G$ acting by the trivial action on $X$. In general, for a group $G$ acting on a space $X$, the homotopy fixed points are the fixed points $F(EG, X)^G$ of the mapping space $F(EG, X)$ of maps from the universal cover $EG$ of $BG$ to $X$ under the $G$-action on $F(EG, X)$ given by $g$ in $G$ acts on a map $f$ in $F(EG, X)$ by sending it to $gfg^{-1}$. The $G$-equivariant map from $EG$ to a single point $*$ induces a natural map η: $X^G = F(*,X)^G$→$F(EG, X)^G$ from the fixed points to the homotopy fixed points of $G$ acting on $X$. Miller's theorem is that η is a weak equivalence for trivial $G$-actions on finite-dimensional CW complexes. An important ingredient and motivation for his proof is a result of Gunnar Carlsson on the homology of $BZ/2$ as an unstable module over the Steenrod algebra.

Miller's theorem generalizes to a version of Sullivan's conjecture in which the action on $X$ is allowed to be non-trivial. In 1971, Sullivan conjectured that η is a weak equivalence after a certain p-completion procedure due to A. Bousfield and D. Kan for the group $G=Z/2$. This conjecture was incorrect as stated, but a correct version was given by Miller, and proven independently by Dwyer-Miller-Neisendorfer, Carlsson, and Jean Lannes, showing that the natural map $(X^G)_p$ → $F(EG, (X)_p)^G$ is a weak equivalence when the order of $G$ is a power of a prime p, and where $(X)_p$ denotes the Bousfield-Kan p-completion of $X$. Miller's proof involves an unstable Adams spectral sequence, Carlsson's proof uses his affirmative solution of the Segal conjecture and also provides information about the homotopy fixed points $F(EG, X)^G$ before completion, and Lannes's proof involves his T-functor.
