= Wild problem =

A wild problem is a class of problems where the various parts that specify the problem can change, or keep changing, and there is no single "right" outcome to aim for. Every move or intended solution reveals new complications, trade-offs have no well-defined end, and "success" depends more on judgment and values rather than a clear formula or finish line. The term has distinct uses in the domains of mathematics and in social sciences and economics.

== Mathematics ==
A wild problem in mathematics is an ill-posed or indeterminate problem lacking a clear, unique solution due to incomplete constraints or evolving parameters. In areas of linear algebra and representation theory, a problem is wild if it contains the problem of classifying pairs of square matrices up to simultaneous similarity. Examples of wild problems are classifying indecomposable representations of any quiver that is neither a Dynkin quiver (i.e. the underlying undirected graph of the quiver is a (finite) Dynkin diagram) nor a Euclidean quiver (i.e., the underlying undirected graph of the quiver is an affine Dynkin diagram).

Necessary and sufficient conditions have been proposed to check the simultaneously block triangularization and diagonalization of a finite set of matrices under the assumption that each matrix is diagonalizable over the field of the complex numbers.

== Social sciences and economics ==
A wild problem, sometimes called a wicked problem, is a high-stakes personal or societal choice—like whom to marry, career paths, or moral dilemmas—that defies data-driven optimization because solutions hinge on unquantifiable values, emotions, and long-term unknowns rather than formulas or trade-offs. Many social, legal, economic, environmental, and political issues are of this type because any solution often requires a great number of people to change their mindsets and behavior.

Examples include natural hazards, healthcare, the AIDS epidemic, pandemic influenza, international drug trafficking, nuclear weapons, homelessness, social injustice, and global climate change.

== See also ==
- Semi-invariant of a quiver
- Wicked problem
