= Group algebra =

In mathematics, the group algebra can mean either

- A group ring of an abelian group over some commutative ring.
- A group algebra of a locally compact group.
