= Reza Zadeh =

- Citizenship: American
- Education: Stanford University (Ph.D.); Carnegie Mellon University (M.Sc.); University of Waterloo (B.S.)
- Known for: Machine Learning; Recommender Systems; Computer Vision
- Scientific career
- Fields: Computer Science
- Workplaces: Stanford University
- Thesis: Large Scale Graph Completion
- Doctoral advisor: Gunnar Carlsson
- Website: stanford.edu/~rezab

Reza Zadeh (Persian: رضا زاده) is an American computer scientist and technology executive working on machine learning. He is adjunct professor at Stanford University, CEO of Matroid, and a founding team member at Databricks. His work focuses on machine learning, distributed computing, and discrete applied mathematics. His awards include a KDD Best Paper Award and the Gene Golub Outstanding Thesis Award at Stanford.

== Work ==
=== Computer Vision ===
The Princeton University ModelNet challenge is an object recognition competition to classify 3D Computer-aided design models into object categories. In 2016, Matroid was a leader in this competition and the relevant neural networks were integrated into the Matroid product.

In a collaboration with his own doctor at Stanford hospital, Reza's research team created a neural network to automatically detect Glaucoma in 3D optical coherence tomography images of the eyeball. The net surpassed human doctor performance and is providing diagnostic hints at the hospital.

In 2016, Reza founded Matroid, inc to commercialize computer vision research by building a product for industries such as manufacturing and industrial sensors. Matroid raised $13.5 million from New Enterprise Associates, Intel, and others.

=== Distributed Machine Learning ===
Reza is a coauthor of Apache Spark, in particular its Machine Learning library, MLlib. Through open source, Reza's work has been incorporated into industrial and academic cluster computing environments. He was a founding team member at Databricks, the company commercializing Spark.

=== Recommender Systems ===
Reza created the machine learning algorithm behind Twitter's Who-To-Follow project and subsequently released it to open source. During that time he also led research tracking earthquake damage via machine learning, gaining wide media attention as an example of real-time social information flow.

=== AI Responsibility ===
During the G7 forum in Italy, Pope Francis stressed that humanity is in great danger, due to the wars that are taking place such as the war in Ukraine, in Gaza, the excessive use of artificial intelligence that is putting at risk to jobs in the world, which made him the first pontiff in history to participate in the maximum meeting of leaders of the largest economies in the world. Pope Francis met with World Leaders during June 14-15 at the Vatican, during which Reza and the pope discussed responsible solutions for deploying Artificial Intelligence.

== Personal ==
Reza was born during the Iran–Iraq War in the under-siege city of Ahvaz. From there, his family emigrated to London, England where Reza grew up until age 17, after which he emigrated to Toronto, Canada, obtaining a degree from University of Waterloo. He frequently visited the US at age 18 to work on the Google Research team, and later moved to the US for a master's degree at Carnegie Mellon University and PhD at Stanford, all in Computer Science and Mathematics.
