= Burnside ring =

Ring that encodes the possible group actions of a finite group

In mathematics, the Burnside ring of a finite group is an algebraic construction that encodes the different ways the group can act on finite sets. The ideas were introduced by William Burnside at the end of the nineteenth century. The algebraic ring structure is a more recent development, due to Solomon (1967).

== Formal definition ==
Given a finite group G, the generators of its Burnside ring Ω(G) are the formal sums of isomorphism classes of finite G-sets. For the ring structure, addition is given by disjoint union of G-sets and multiplication by their Cartesian product.

The Burnside ring is a free Z-module, whose generators are the (isomorphism classes of) orbit types of G.

If G acts on a finite set X, then one can write $X = \bigcup_i X_i$ (disjoint union), where each X_{i} is a single G-orbit. Choosing any element x_{i} in X_{i} creates an isomorphism G/G_{i} → X_{i}, where G_{i} is the stabilizer (isotropy) subgroup of G at x_{i}. A different choice of representative y_{i} in X_{i} gives a conjugate subgroup to G_{i} as stabilizer. This shows that the generators of Ω(G) as a Z-module are the orbits G/H as H ranges over conjugacy classes of subgroups of G.

In other words, a typical element of Ω(G) is
$$\sum_{i=1}^N a_i [G/G_i],$$
where a_{i} in Z and G_{1}, G_{2}, ..., G_{N} are representatives of the conjugacy classes of subgroups of G.

== Marks ==
Much as character theory simplifies working with group representations, marks simplify working with permutation representations and the Burnside ring.

If G acts on X, and H ≤ G (H is a subgroup of G), then the mark of H on X is the number of elements of X that are fixed by every element of H: $m_X(H) = \left|X^H\right|$, where
$$X^H = \{ x\in X \mid h\cdot x = x, \forall h\in H\}.$$
If H and K are conjugate subgroups, then m_{X}(H) = m_{X}(K) for any finite G-set X; indeed, if K = gHg^{−1} then X^{K} = g · X^{H}.

It is also easy to see that for each H ≤ G, the map Ω(G) → Z : X ↦ m_{X}(H) is a homomorphism. This means that to know the marks of G, it is sufficient to evaluate them on the generators of Ω(G), viz. the orbits G/H.

For each pair of subgroups H,K ≤ G define
$$m(K, H) = \left|[G/K]^H\right| = \# \left\{ gK \in G/K \mid HgK=gK \right\}.$$
This is m_{X}(H) for X = G/K. The condition HgK = gK is equivalent to g^{−1}Hg ≤ K, so if H is not conjugate to a subgroup of K then m(K, H) = 0.

To record all possible marks, one forms a table, Burnside's Table of Marks, as follows: Let G_{1} (= trivial subgroup), G_{2}, ..., G_{N} = G be representatives of the N conjugacy classes of subgroups of G, ordered in such a way that whenever G_{i} is conjugate to a subgroup of G_{j}, then i ≤ j. Now define the N × N table (square matrix) whose (i, j)th entry is m(G_{i}, G_{j}). This matrix is lower triangular, and the elements on the diagonal are non-zero so it is invertible.

It follows that if X is a G-set, and u its row vector of marks, so u_{i} = m_{X}(G_{i}), then X decomposes as a disjoint union of a_{i} copies of the orbit of type G_{i}, where the vector a satisfies,

aM = u,

where M is the matrix of the table of marks. This theorem is due to (Burnside 1897).

== Examples ==
The table of marks for the cyclic group of order 6:

| Z_{6} | 1 | Z_{2} | Z_{3} | Z_{6} |
| Z_{6} / 1 | 6 | . | . | . |
| Z_{6} / Z_{2} | 3 | 3 | . | . |
| Z_{6} / Z_{3} | 2 | 0 | 2 | . |
| Z_{6} / Z_{6} | 1 | 1 | 1 | 1 |

The table of marks for the symmetric group S_{3}:

| S_{3} | 1 | Z_{2} | Z_{3} | S_{3} |
| S_{3} / 1 | 6 | . | . | . |
| S_{3} / Z_{2} | 3 | 1 | . | . |
| S_{3} / Z_{3} | 2 | 0 | 2 | . |
| S_{3} / S_{3} | 1 | 1 | 1 | 1 |

The dots in the two tables are all zeros, merely emphasizing the fact that the tables are lower-triangular.

(Some authors use the transpose of the table, but this is how Burnside defined it originally.)

The fact that the last row is all 1s is because [G/G] is a single point. The diagonal terms are m(H, H) = | N_{G}(H)/H |. The numbers in the first column show the degree of the representation.

The ring structure of Ω(G) can be deduced from these tables: the generators of the ring (as a Z-module) are the rows of the table, and the product of two generators has mark given by the product of the marks (so component-wise multiplication of row vectors), which can then be decomposed as a linear combination of all the rows. For example, with S_{3},
$$[G/\mathbf{Z}_2]\cdot[G/\mathbf{Z}_3] = [G/1],$$
as (3, 1, 0, 0).(2, 0, 2, 0) = (6, 0, 0, 0).

== Permutation representations ==
Associated to any finite set X is a vector space V = V_{X}, which is the vector space with the elements of X as the basis (using any specified field). An action of a finite group G on X induces a linear action on V, called a permutation representation. The set of all finite-dimensional representations of G has the structure of a ring, the representation ring, denoted R(G).

For a given G-set X, the character of the associated representation is

$$\chi(g) = m_X(\langle g\rangle)$$

where $\langle g\rangle$ is the cyclic group generated by $g$.

The resulting map
$$\beta : \Omega(G) \longrightarrow R(G)$$
taking a G-set to the corresponding representation is in general neither injective nor surjective.

The simplest example showing that β is not in general injective is for G = S_{3} (see table above), and is given by
$$\beta(2[S_3/\mathbf{Z}_2] + [S_3/\mathbf{Z}_3]) = \beta([S_3] + 2[S_3/S_3]).$$

== Extensions ==
The Burnside ring for compact groups is described in (tom Dieck 1987).

The Segal conjecture relates the Burnside ring to homotopy.

== See also ==
- Burnside category
