= Augmentation (algebra) =

In algebra, an augmentation of an associative algebra A over a commutative ring k is a k-algebra homomorphism $A \to k$, typically denoted by ε. An algebra together with an augmentation is called an augmented algebra. The kernel of the augmentation is a two-sided ideal called the augmentation ideal of A.

For example, if $A =k[G]$ is the group algebra of a finite group G, then

$$A \to k,\, \sum a_i x_i \mapsto \sum a_i$$

is an augmentation.

If A is a graded algebra which is connected, i.e. $A_0=k$, then the homomorphism $A\to k$ which maps an element to its homogeneous component of degree 0 is an augmentation. For example,

$$k[x]\to k, \sum a_ix^i \mapsto a_0$$

is an augmentation on the polynomial ring $k[x]$.
