= Burnside category =

Category theory

In category theory and homotopy theory the Burnside category of a finite group G is a category whose objects are finite G-sets and whose morphisms are (equivalence classes of) spans of G-equivariant maps. It is a categorification of the Burnside ring of G.

== Definitions ==
Let G be a finite group (in fact everything will work verbatim for a profinite group). Then for any two finite G-sets X and Y we can define an equivalence relation among spans of G-sets of the form $X\leftarrow U \rightarrow Y$ where two spans $X\leftarrow U \rightarrow Y$ and $X\leftarrow W \rightarrow Y$are equivalent if and only if there is a G-equivariant bijection of U and W commuting with the projection maps to X and Y. This set of equivalence classes form naturally a monoid under disjoint union; we indicate with $A(G)(X,Y)$ the group completion of that monoid. Taking pullbacks induces natural maps $A(G)(X,Y)\times A(G)(Y,Z)\rightarrow A(G)(X,Z)$.

Finally we can define the Burnside category A(G) of G as the category whose objects are finite G-sets and the morphisms spaces are the groups $A(G)(X,Y)$.

== Properties ==
- A(G) is an additive category with direct sums given by the disjoint union of G-sets and zero object given by the empty G-set;
- The product of two G-sets induces a symmetric monoidal structure on A(G);
- The endomorphism ring of the point (that is the G-set with only one element) is the Burnside ring of G;
- A(G) is equivalent to the full subcategory of the homotopy category of genuine G-spectra spanned by the suspension spectra of finite G-sets.
- The Burnside category is self-dual.

== Mackey functors ==
If C is an additive category, then a C-valued Mackey functor is an additive functor from A(G) to C. Mackey functors are important in representation theory and stable equivariant homotopy theory.

- To every G-representation V we can associate a Mackey functor in vector spaces sending every finite G-set U to the vector space of G-equivariant maps from U to V.
- The homotopy groups of a genuine G-spectrum form a Mackey functor. In fact genuine G-spectra can be seen as additive functor on an appropriately higher categorical version of the Burnside category.
