= Brooke Shipley =

American mathematician

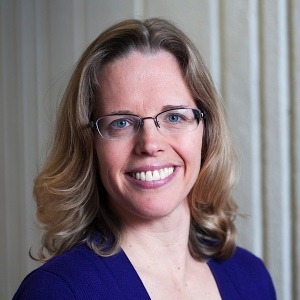
- Education: Massachusetts Institute of Technology; Harvard College
- Awards: Sloan Research Fellow (2002–2006); NSF CAREER Award (2002–2009); NSF ADVANCE (2006–2012)
- Scientific career
- Fields: Mathematics
- Workplaces: University of Illinois at Chicago; Purdue University; University of Chicago; University of Notre Dame
- Doctoral advisor: Haynes Miller

Brooke Elizabeth Shipley is an American mathematician. She works as a professor at the University of Illinois at Chicago, where she was head of the Department of Mathematics, Statistics and Computer Science from 2014 to 2022. Her research concerns homotopy theory and homological algebra.

== Education and career ==
Shipley graduated from Harvard University in 1990. She earned her Ph.D. in 1995 from the Massachusetts Institute of Technology, under the supervision of Haynes Miller, for her work on the convergence of the homology spectral sequence of a cosimplicial space.

Shipley then was awarded a NSF Postdoctoral Research Fellowship. After postdoctoral studies at the University of Notre Dame and the University of Chicago, she joined the faculty of Purdue University in 1998 and earned tenure there in 2002. She then moved to University of Illinois at Chicago in 2003.

In 2009, Shipley became Co-Principal Investigator on UIC's National Science Foundation's ADVANCE grant to support the Women in Science and Engineering System Transformation (WISEST) program. She served as the director of WISEST from 2012 to 2013. She served as an American Mathematical Society Council member at large from 2018 to 2020.

== Recognition ==
In 2014, she was elected as a fellow of the American Mathematical Society "for contributions to homotopy theory and homological algebra as well as for service to the mathematical community." Then in 2016, she became a representative of the Committee of Academic Sponsors at the Mathematical Sciences Research Institute

She and John Greenlees were the joint winners of the 2022 Senior Berwick Prize for their paper "An algebraic model for rational torus-equivariant spectra".

== Selected Papers ==
- Brooke Shipley, HZ-algebra spectra are differential graded algebras, American Journal of Mathematics, 129(2):351–379, 2007. MR 2306038
- Hovey, Mark; Shipley, Brooke; Smith, Jeff (2000), "Symmetric spectra", Journal of the American Mathematical Society, 13 (1): 149–208, doi:10.1090/S0894-0347-99-00320-3, MR 1695653

== Awards ==
- NSF Career Award (2002-2009)
- Purdue University School of Science Outstanding Assistant Professor (2001)
