= Semi-invariant of a quiver =

In mathematics, the ring of semi-invariants is a subring of the coordinate ring of a quiver that containing those functions which are invariant under the action of a certain algebraic group, up to a character of that group. Specifically, given a representation of a quiver with vertices Q_{0}, there is a natural action of the algebraic group Π_{i∈Q_{0}} GL(d(i)) by simultaneous base change. Such an action induces an action on the ring of functions. The functions which are invariant up to a character of the group are called semi-invariants. They form a ring whose structure reflects representation-theoretical properties of the quiver.

== Definitions ==
Let Q = (Q_{0},Q_{1},s,t) be a quiver. Consider a dimension vector d, that is an element in $\mathbb{N}$^{Q_{0}}. The set of d-dimensional representations is given by

$$\operatorname{Rep}(Q,\mathbf{d}):=\{V\in \operatorname{Rep}(Q) : V_i = \mathbf{d}(i)\}$$

Once fixed bases for each vector space V_{i} this can be identified with the vector space

$$\bigoplus_{\alpha\in Q_1} \operatorname{Hom}_k(k^{\mathbf{d}(s(\alpha))}, k^{\mathbf{d}(t(\alpha))})$$

Such affine variety is endowed with an action of the algebraic group GL(d) := Π_{i∈Q_{0}} GL(d(i)) by simultaneous base change on each vertex:

$$\begin{array}{ccc}
GL(\mathbf{d}) \times \operatorname{Rep}(Q,\mathbf{d}) & \longrightarrow & \operatorname{Rep}(Q,\mathbf{d})\\
\Big((g_i), (V_i, V(\alpha))\Big) & \longmapsto & (V_i,g_{t(\alpha)}\cdot V(\alpha)\cdot g_{s(\alpha)}^{-1} )
\end{array}$$

By definition two modules M,N ∈ Rep(Q,d) are isomorphic if and only if their GL(d)-orbits coincide.

We have an induced action on the coordinate ring k[Rep(Q,d)] by defining:

$$\begin{array}{ccc}
GL(\mathbf{d}) \times k[\operatorname{Rep}(Q,\mathbf{d})] & \longrightarrow & k[\operatorname{Rep}(Q,\mathbf{d})]\\
(g, f) & \longmapsto & g\cdot f(-):=f(g^{-1}. -)
\end{array}$$

=== Polynomial invariants ===
An element f ∈ k[Rep(Q,d)] is called an invariant (with respect to GL(d)) if g⋅f = f for any g ∈ GL(d). The set of invariants

$$I(Q,\mathbf{d}):=k[\operatorname{Rep}(Q,\mathbf{d})]^{GL(\mathbf{d})}$$

is in general a subalgebra of k[Rep(Q,d)].

==== Example ====
Consider the 1-loop quiver Q:

For d = (n) the representation space is End(k^{n}) and the action of GL(n) is given by usual conjugation. The invariant ring is

$$I(Q,\mathbf{d})=k[c_1,\ldots,c_n]$$

where the c_{i}s are defined, for any A ∈ End(k^{n}), as the coefficients of the characteristic polynomial

$$\det(A-t \mathbb{I})=t^n-c_1(A)t^{n-1}+\cdots+(-1)^n c_n(A)$$

=== Semi-invariants ===
In case Q has neither loops nor cycles, the variety k[Rep(Q,d)] has a unique closed orbit corresponding to the unique d-dimensional semi-simple representation, therefore any invariant function is constant.

Elements which are invariants with respect to the subgroup SL(d) := Π_{i∈Q_{0}} SL(d(i)) form a ring, SI(Q,d), with a richer structure called ring of semi-invariants. It decomposes as

$$SI(Q,\mathbf{d})=\bigoplus_{\sigma\in \mathbb{Z}^{Q_0}} SI(Q,\mathbf{d})_{\sigma}$$

where

$$SI(Q,\mathbf{d})_{\sigma}:= \{f\in k[\operatorname{Rep}(Q,\mathbf{d})] : g\cdot f = \prod_{i\in Q_0}\det(g_i)^{\sigma_i} f, \forall g\in GL(\mathbf{d})\}.$$

A function belonging to SI(Q,d)_{σ} is called semi-invariant of weight σ.

==== Example ====
Consider the quiver Q:

$$1 \xrightarrow{\ \ \alpha\ } 2$$

Fix d = (n,n). In this case k[Rep(Q,(n,n))] is congruent to the set of n-by-n matrices: M(n). The function defined, for any B ∈ M(n), as det^{u}(B(α)) is a semi-invariant of weight (u,−u) in fact

$$(g_1,g_2)\cdot {\det}^u (B) = {\det}^u(g_2^{-1}B g_1)= {\det}^u(g_1) {\det}^{-u}(g_2) {\det}^u(B)$$

The ring of semi-invariants equals the polynomial ring generated by det, i.e.

$$\mathsf{SI}(Q,\mathbf{d})=k[\det]$$

== Characterization of representation type through semi-invariant theory ==
For quivers of finite representation-type, that is to say Dynkin quivers, the vector space k[Rep(Q,d)] admits an open dense orbit. In other words, it is a prehomogenous vector space. Sato and Kimura described the ring of semi-invariants in such case.

=== Sato–Kimura theorem ===
Let Q be a Dynkin quiver, d a dimension vector. Let Σ be the set of weights σ such that there exists f_{σ} ∈ SI(Q,d)_{σ} non-zero and irreducible. Then the following properties hold:

1. For every weight σ we have dim_{k} SI(Q,d)_{σ} ≤ 1.
2. All weights in Σ are linearly independent over $\mathbb{Q}$.
3. SI(Q,d) is the polynomial ring generated by the f_{σ}'s, σ ∈ Σ.

Furthermore, we have an interpretation for the generators of this polynomial algebra. Let O be the open orbit, then k[Rep(Q,d)] \ O = Z_{1} ∪ ... ∪ Z_{t} where each Z_{i} is closed and irreducible. We can assume that the Z_{i}s are arranged in increasing order with respect to the codimension so that the first l have codimension one and Z_{i} is the zero-set of the irreducible polynomial f_{1}, then SI(Q,d) = k[f_{1}, ..., f_{l}].

==== Example ====
In the example above the action of GL(n,n) has an open orbit on M(n) consisting of invertible matrices. Then we immediately recover SI(Q,(n,n)) = k[det].

Skowronski–Weyman provided a geometric characterization of the class of tame quivers (i.e. Dynkin and Euclidean quivers) in terms of semi-invariants.

=== Skowronski–Weyman theorem ===
Let Q be a finite connected quiver. The following are equivalent:

1. Q is either a Dynkin quiver or a Euclidean quiver.
2. For each dimension vector d, the algebra SI(Q,d) is complete intersection.
3. For each dimension vector d, the algebra SI(Q,d) is either a polynomial algebra or a hypersurface.

==== Example ====
Consider the Euclidean quiver Q:

Pick the dimension vector d = (1,1,1,1,2). An element V ∈ k[Rep(Q,d)] can be identified with a quadruple (A_{1}, A_{2}, A_{3}, A_{4}) of matrices in M(1,2). Call D_{i,j} the function defined on each V as det(A_{i},A_{j}). Such functions generate the ring of semi-invariants:

$$SI(Q,\mathbf{d})=\frac{k[D_{1,2},D_{3,4},D_{1,4},D_{2,3},D_{1,3},D_{2,4}]}{D_{1,2}D_{3,4}+D_{1,4}D_{2,3}-D_{1,3}D_{2,4}}$$

== See also ==
- Wild problem
