= Jean Lannes (mathematician) =

French mathematician (born 1947)

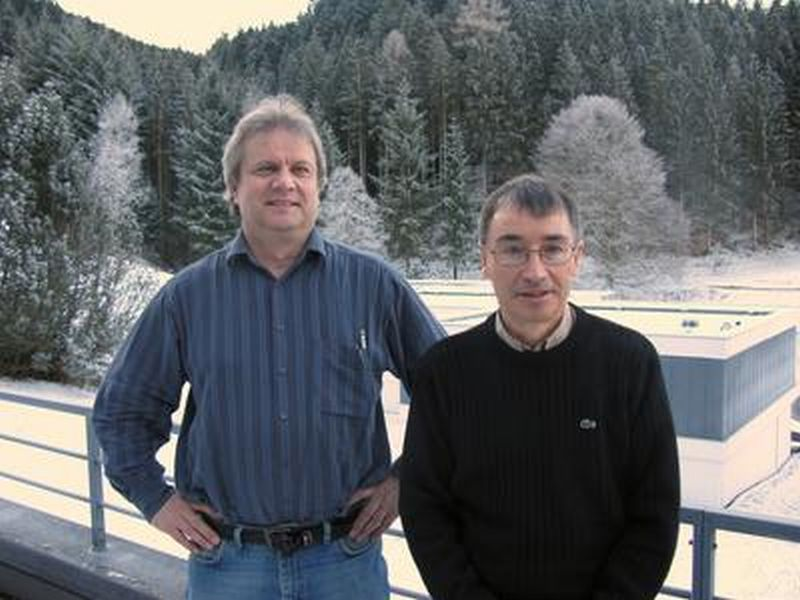
- Hans-Werner Henn (left) and Jean Lannes in Oberwolfach 2009
- Born: 21 September 1947 (age 78); Pauligne, France
- Education: Lycée Louis-le-Grand
- Alma mater: École Normale Supérieure
- Occupation: Mathematician

Jean E. Lannes (born 21 September 1947) is a French mathematician, specializing in algebraic topology and homotopy theory.

Lannes completed his secondary studies at the Lycée Louis-le-Grand in Paris and graduated in 1966 from the École Normale Supérieure. He received his doctorate in 1975 from the University of Paris-Saclay (Paris 12). Afterwards he was a professor there and at the Paris Diderot University (Paris 7). In 2009 he became a professor at the École polytechnique and Directeur des recherches at the Centre de mathématiques Laurent-Schwartz (CMLS); he is now professor emeritus. He was a visiting scholar at several academic institutions, including the Institute for Advanced Study (1979/80) and the Massachusetts Institute of Technology (MIT).

Lannes is known for his research on the homotopy theory of classifying spaces of groups. He proved in the mid-1980s the generalized Sullivan conjecture (which was also proven independently by Gunnar Carlsson and Haynes Miller). The mod p cohomology of the classifying spaces of certain finite groups (elementary Abelian p-groups, for which the generalized Sullivan conjecture was formulated) played an important role in the proof. The connection between the cohomology theory of these finite groups and the classifying spaces of groups is illuminated by the work of Lannes. He introduced the $T$-functor on the category of unstable algebra over the Steenrod algebra. Lannes thus led an important development of algebraic topology in the 1980s. He has collaborated extensively with Lionel Schwartz, Hans-Werner Henn, and Saîd Zarati.

Lannes has also done research on the knot invariants of Vassiliev.

He was an invited speaker at the International Congress of Mathematicians (ICM) in Zurich in 1994. His doctoral candidates include Fabien Morel. In 2007 there was a conference in Djerba in honor of Lannes's 60th birthday.

== Selected publications ==
- with Lionel Schwartz: Lannes, Jean; Schwartz, Lionel (1986). "A propos de conjectures de Serre et Sullivan". Inventiones Mathematicae. 83 (3): 593–603. Bibcode:1986InMat..83..593L. doi:10.1007/BF01394425. S2CID 118926835. Online
- Cohomology of groups and function spaces, Preprint 1986 (not published)
- Sur la cohomologie modulo $p$ des $p$-groupes abeliennes elementaire, Proc. Durham Symposium 1985, Cambridge University Press 1987
- with Saîd Zarati: Sur les U-injectifs, Annales Scient. ENS, vol. 19, 1986, pp. 303–333, Online
- Lannes, Jean (1992). "Sur les espaces fonctionnels dont la source est le classifiant d'un p-groupe abélien élémentaire" (PDF). Publications Mathématiques de l'IHÉS. 75: 135–244. doi:10.1007/BF02699494. S2CID 118061922.
- with H. W. Henn and L. Schwartz: Localizations of unstable A-modules and equivariant mod p cohomology. Mathematische Annalen, 301(1), 1995 23-68.
- with Jean Barge: Suites de Sturm, indice de Maslov et périodicité de Bott, Birkhäuser 2008
- with Gaëtan Chenevier : Automorphic Forms and Even Unimodular Lattices, Springer 2019
