= Haynes Miller =

American mathematician

Haynes Robert Miller (born January 29, 1948, in Princeton, New Jersey) is an American mathematician specializing in algebraic topology.

Miller completed his undergraduate study at Harvard University and earned his PhD in 1974 under the supervision of John Coleman Moore at Princeton University with thesis Some Algebraic Aspects of the Adams–Novikov Spectral Sequence. After his PhD, he became an assistant professor at Harvard and at Northwestern University, from 1977 at the University of Washington, and from 1984 a professor at the University of Notre Dame. Since 1986 he is a professor at the Massachusetts Institute of Technology (MIT). From 1992 to 1993 he was MIT's Chair of the Committee for Pure Mathematics, since 2004 Chair of the Undergraduate Mathematics Committee, and since 2005 MacVicar Faculty Fellow. His doctoral students at MIT include Brooke Shipley.

In 1984 Miller proved the generalized Sullivan conjecture, independently of Jean Lannes and Gunnar Carlsson.

In 1986 he was an invited speaker at the International Congress of Mathematicians in Berkeley, California (The Sullivan conjecture and homotopical representation theory). In 2012 he became a fellow of the American Mathematical Society.
