= Graeme Segal =

Australian mathematician

Graeme Segal FRS
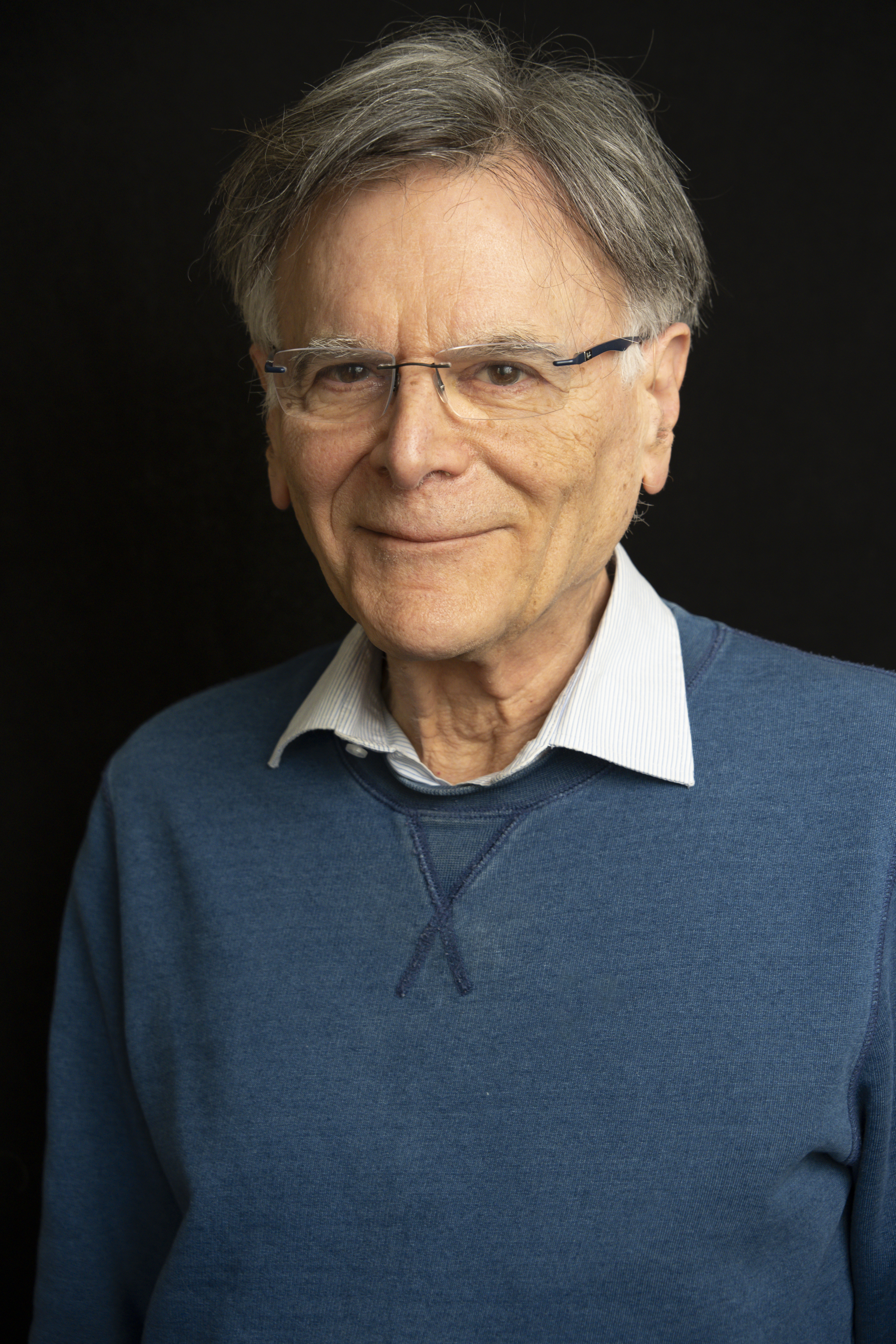
- Graeme Segal in 2026
- Born: 21 December 1941 (age 84); Sydney, Australia
- Education: University of Sydney; St Catherine's College, Oxford
- Known for: Atiyah–Segal completion theorem Segal conjecture
- Spouse: Marina Warner
- Awards: Pólya Prize (1990); Sylvester Medal (2010); Chern Medal (2026)
- Scientific career
- Fields: Mathematics
- Workplaces: Worcester College, Oxford; St Catherine's College, Oxford; St John's College, Cambridge; All Souls College, Oxford
- Thesis: Equivariant K-theory (1967)
- Doctoral advisor: Michael Atiyah

Graeme Bryce Segal FRS (born 21 December 1941) is an Australian mathematician, and professor at the University of Oxford.

== Biography ==
Segal was educated at Sydney Grammar School, where he graduated in 1957. He was Dux of the School and finished first in the state overall in the NSW Leaving Certificate. He then studied at the University of Sydney, where he received his BSc degree and the University Medal for pure mathematics in 1961. He went on to receive his D.Phil. in 1967 from St Catherine's College, Oxford; his thesis, written under the supervision of Michael Atiyah, was titled Equivariant K-theory.

His thesis was in the area of equivariant K-theory. The Atiyah–Segal completion theorem in that subject was a major motivation for the Segal conjecture, which he formulated. He has made many other contributions to homotopy theory in the past four decades, including an approach to infinite loop spaces. He was also a pioneer of elliptic cohomology, which is related to his interest in topological quantum field theory.

Segal was an Invited Speaker at the ICM in 1970 in Nice and in 1990 in Kyoto. He taught at Oxford University from 1964 to 1990, then became the Lowndean Professor of Astronomy and Geometry at the University of Cambridge from 1990 to 1999, and then a Senior Research Fellow of All Souls College, Oxford from 1999 to 2009. He was elected the President of the London Mathematical Society in 2011.

He was elected a Fellow of the Royal Society in 1982 and was awarded the Sylvester Medal by the Royal Society in 2010.

At the 2026 ICM, Segal was awarded the Chern Medal "for his visionary mathematical insights that have had an enduring influence in a wide range of fields, including topology, mathematical physics, representation theory and category theory."

He is married to writer Marina Warner. They live in London.

== Books ==
- Loop Groups (Oxford Mathematical Monographs). New ed. Clarendon Press, Oxford 2003, ISBN 0-19-853561-9 (with Andrew Pressley).
- Lectures on Lie groups and Lie algebras (London Mathematical Society Student texts Vol. 32). 5th ed. Cambridge University Press, Cambridge 2006, ISBN 0-521-49579-2 (with Ian G. Macdonald and Roger Carter).
