= Segal's conjecture =

Theorem in homotopy theory

Segal's Burnside ring conjecture, or, more briefly, the Segal conjecture, is a theorem in homotopy theory, a branch of mathematics. The theorem relates the Burnside ring of a finite group G to the stable cohomotopy of the classifying space BG. The conjecture was made in the mid 1970s by Graeme Segal and proved in 1984 by Gunnar Carlsson. This statement is still commonly referred to as the Segal conjecture, even though it now has the status of a theorem.

== Statement of the theorem ==
The Segal conjecture has several different formulations, not all of which are equivalent. Here is a weak form: there exists, for every finite group G, an isomorphism

$$\varprojlim \pi_S^0 \left( BG^{(k)}_+ \right) \to \widehat{A}(G).$$

Here, lim denotes the inverse limit, π_{S}* denotes the stable cohomotopy ring, B denotes the classifying space, the superscript k denotes the k-skeleton, and the subscript + denotes the addition of a disjoint basepoint. On the right-hand side, the hat denotes the completion of the Burnside ring with respect to its augmentation ideal.

== The Burnside ring ==
The Burnside ring of a finite group G is constructed from the category of finite G-sets as a Grothendieck group. More precisely, let M(G) be the commutative monoid of isomorphism classes of finite G-sets, with addition the disjoint union of G-sets and identity element the empty set (which is a G-set in a unique way). Then A(G), the Grothendieck group of M(G), is an abelian group. It is in fact a free abelian group with basis elements represented by the G-sets G/H, where H varies over the subgroups of G. (Note that H is not assumed here to be a normal subgroup of G, for while G/H is not a group in this case, it is still a G-set.) The ring structure on A(G) is induced by the direct product of G-sets; the multiplicative identity is the (isomorphism class of any) one-point set, which becomes a G-set in a unique way.

The Burnside ring is the analogue of the representation ring in the category of finite sets, as opposed to the category of finite-dimensional vector spaces over a field (see motivation below). It has proven to be an important tool in the representation theory of finite groups.

== The classifying space ==
For any topological group G admitting the structure of a CW-complex, one may consider the category of principal G-bundles. One can define a functor from the category of CW-complexes to the category of sets by assigning to each CW-complex X the set of principal G-bundles on X. This functor descends to a functor on the homotopy category of CW-complexes, and it is natural to ask whether the functor so obtained is representable. The answer is affirmative, and the representing object is called the classifying space of the group G and typically denoted BG. If we restrict our attention to the homotopy category of CW-complexes, then BG is unique. Any CW-complex that is homotopy equivalent to BG is called a model for BG.

For example, if G is the group of order 2, then a model for BG is infinite-dimensional real projective space. It can be shown that if G is finite, then any CW-complex modelling BG has cells of arbitrarily large dimension. On the other hand, if G = Z, the integers, then the classifying space BG is homotopy equivalent to the circle S^{1}.

== Motivation and interpretation ==
The content of the theorem becomes somewhat clearer if it is placed in its historical context. In the theory of representations of finite groups, one can form an object $R[G]$ called the representation ring of $G$ in a way entirely analogous to the construction of the Burnside ring outlined above. The stable cohomotopy is in a sense the natural analog to complex K-theory, which is denoted $KU^*$. Segal was inspired to make his conjecture after Michael Atiyah proved the existence of an isomorphism

$$KU^0(BG) \to \widehat{R}[G]$$

which is a special case of the Atiyah–Segal completion theorem.
