= Augmentation ideal =

In algebra, an augmentation ideal is an ideal that can be defined in any group ring.

If G is a group and R a commutative ring, there is a ring homomorphism $\varepsilon$, called the augmentation map, from the group ring $R[G]$ to $R$, defined by taking a (finite (Note: When constructing R[G], we restrict R[G] to only finite (formal) sums)) sum $\sum r_i g_i$ to $\sum r_i.$ (Here $r_i\in R$ and $g_i\in G$.) In less formal terms, $\varepsilon(g)=1_R$ for any element $g\in G$, $\varepsilon(rg)=r$ for any elements $r\in R$ and $g\in G$, and $\varepsilon$ is then extended to a homomorphism of R-modules in the obvious way.

The augmentation ideal A is the kernel of $\varepsilon$ and is therefore a two-sided ideal in R[G].

A is generated by the differences $g - g'$ of group elements. Equivalently, it is also generated by $\{g - 1 : g\in G\}$, which is a basis for A as a free R-module.

For R and G as above, the group ring R[G] is an example of an augmented R-algebra. Such an algebra comes equipped with a ring homomorphism to R. The kernel of this homomorphism is the augmentation ideal of the algebra.

The augmentation ideal plays a basic role in group cohomology, amongst other applications.

== Examples of quotients by the augmentation ideal ==
- Let G a group and $\mathbb{Z}[G]$ the group ring over the integers. Let I denote the augmentation ideal of $\mathbb{Z}[G]$. Then the quotient I/I^{2} is isomorphic to the abelianization of G, defined as the quotient of G by its commutator subgroup.
- A complex representation V of a group G is a $\mathbb{C}[G]$ - module. The coinvariants of V can then be described as the quotient of V by IV, where I is the augmentation ideal in $\mathbb{C}[G]$.
- Another class of examples of augmentation ideal can be the kernel of the counit $\varepsilon$ of any Hopf algebra.
