= Quiver (mathematics) =

Directed graph which is also a multigraph

In mathematics, especially representation theory, a quiver is another name for a multidigraph; that is, a directed graph where loops and multiple arrows between two vertices are allowed. Quivers are commonly used in representation theory: a representation V of a quiver assigns a vector space V(x) to each vertex x of the quiver and a linear map V(a) to each arrow a.

In category theory, a quiver can be understood to be the underlying structure of a small category, but without composition or a designation of identity morphisms. That is, there is a forgetful functor from Cat (the category of small categories) to Quiv (the category of multidigraphs). Its left adjoint is a free functor which, from a quiver, makes the corresponding free category.

== Definition ==
A quiver Γ consists of:

- The set V of vertices of Γ
- The set E of edges of Γ
- Two functions: $s:E \to V$ giving the start or source of the edge, and another function, $t:E \to V$ giving the target of the edge.

This definition is identical to that of a multidigraph that has edges with their own distinct identity.

An edge $e \in E$ is a loop if $s(e) = t(e).$

A morphism of quivers is a mapping from vertices to vertices which takes directed edges to directed edges. Formally, if $\Gamma=(V,E,s,t)$ and $\Gamma'=(V',E',s',t')$ are two quivers, then a morphism $m=(m_v, m_e)$ of quivers consists of two functions $m_v: V\to V'$ and $m_e: E\to E'$ such that the following diagrams commute:

That is,

$$m_v \circ s = s' \circ m_e$$

and

$$m_v \circ t = t' \circ m_e$$

== Category-theoretic definition ==
The above definition is based in set theory; the category-theoretic definition generalizes this into a functor from the free quiver to the category of sets.

The free quiver (also called the walking quiver, Kronecker quiver, 2-Kronecker quiver or Kronecker category) Q is a category with two objects, and four morphisms: The objects are V and E. The four morphisms are $s: E \to V$, $t: E \to V$, and the identity morphisms $\mathrm{id}_V: V \to V$ and $\mathrm{id}_E: E \to E$. That is, the free quiver is the category

$$E
\;\begin{matrix} s \\[-6pt] \rightrightarrows \\[-4pt] t \end{matrix}\; V$$

A quiver is then a functor $\Gamma:Q \to \mathbf{Set}$. (That is to say, $\Gamma$ specifies two sets $\Gamma(V)$ and $\Gamma(E)$, and two functions $\Gamma(s),\Gamma(t)\colon \Gamma(E) \longrightarrow \Gamma(V)$; this is the full extent of what it means to be a functor from $Q$ to $\mathbf{Set}$.)

More generally, a quiver in a category C is a functor $\Gamma: Q \to C.$ The category Quiv(C) of quivers in C is the functor category where:

- objects are functors $\Gamma:Q \to C,$
- morphisms are natural transformations between functors.

Note that Quiv is the category of presheaves on the opposite category Q^{op}.

== Path algebra ==
If $\Gamma$ is a quiver, then a path in $\Gamma$ is a sequence of arrows
$$a_n a_{n-1} \dots a_3 a_2 a_1$$
such that the head of $a_{i+1}$ is the tail of $a_i$ for $i=1,\ldots,n-1$, using the convention of concatenating paths from right to left. Note that a path in graph theory has a stricter definition, and that this concept instead coincides with what in graph theory is called a walk.

If $K$ is a field then the quiver algebra or path algebra $K\,\Gamma$ is defined as a vector space having all the paths (of length $\geq 0$) in the quiver as basis (including, for each vertex $i$ of the quiver $\Gamma$, a trivial path $e_i$ of length 0; these paths are not assumed to be equal for different $i$), and multiplication given by concatenation of paths. If two paths cannot be concatenated because the end vertex of the first is not equal to the starting vertex of the second, their product is defined to be zero. This defines an associative algebra over $K$. This algebra has a unit element if and only if the quiver has only finitely many vertices. In this case, the modules over $K\,\Gamma$ are naturally identified with the representations of $\Gamma$. If the quiver has infinitely many vertices, then $K\,\Gamma$ has an approximate identity given by $e_F:=\sum_{v\in F} 1_v$ where $F$ ranges over finite subsets of the vertex set of $\Gamma$.

If the quiver has finitely many vertices and arrows, and the end vertex and starting vertex of any path are always distinct (i.e. Q has no oriented cycles), then K Γ is a finite-dimensional hereditary algebra over K. Conversely, if K is algebraically closed, then any finite-dimensional, hereditary, associative algebra over K is Morita equivalent to the path algebra of its Ext quiver (i.e., they have equivalent module categories).

== Representations of quivers ==
A representation of a quiver Γ is an association of an R-module to each vertex of Γ, and a morphism between each module for each arrow.

A representation V of a quiver Γ is said to be trivial if $V(x)=0$ for all vertices x in Γ.

A morphism, $f:V \to V',$ between representations of the quiver Γ, is a collection of linear maps $f(x):V(x) \to V'(x)$ such that for every arrow a in Γ from x to y, $V'(a)f(x) = f(y)V(a),$ i.e. the squares that f forms with the arrows of V and V' all commute. A morphism, f, is an isomorphism, if f (x) is invertible for all vertices x in the quiver. With these definitions the representations of a quiver form a category.

If V and W are representations of a quiver Γ, then the direct sum of these representations, $V\oplus W,$ is defined by $(V\oplus W)(x)=V(x)\oplus W(x)$ for all vertices x in Γ and $(V\oplus W)(a)$ is the direct sum of the linear mappings V(a) and W(a).

A representation is said to be decomposable if it is isomorphic to the direct sum of non-zero representations.

A categorical definition of a quiver representation can also be given. The quiver itself can be considered a category, where the vertices are objects and paths are morphisms. Then a representation of Γ is just a covariant functor from this category to the category of finite dimensional vector spaces. Morphisms of representations of Γ are precisely natural transformations between the corresponding functors.

For a finite quiver Γ (a quiver with finitely many vertices and edges), let K Γ be its path algebra. Let e_{i} denote the trivial path at vertex i. Then we can associate to the vertex i the projective K Γ-module K Γe_{i} consisting of linear combinations of paths which have starting vertex i. This corresponds to the representation of Γ obtained by putting a copy of K at each vertex which lies on a path starting at i and 0 on each other vertex. To each edge joining two copies of K we associate the identity map.

This theory was related to cluster algebras by Derksen, Weyman, and Zelevinsky.

== Quiver with relations ==
To enforce commutativity of some squares inside a quiver a generalization is the notion of quivers with relations (also named bound quivers). A relation on a quiver Γ is a K linear combination of paths from Γ. A quiver with relation is a pair (Γ, I) with Γ a quiver and $I \subseteq K\Gamma$ an ideal of the path algebra. The quotient K Γ / I is the path algebra of (Γ, I).

=== Quiver Variety ===
Given the dimensions of the vector spaces assigned to every vertex, one can form a variety which characterizes all representations of that quiver with those specified dimensions, and consider stability conditions. These give quiver varieties, as constructed by King (1994).

== Gabriel's theorem ==
A quiver is of finite type if it has only finitely many isomorphism classes of indecomposable representations. Gabriel (1972) classified all quivers of finite type, and also their indecomposable representations. More precisely, Gabriel's theorem states that:

1. A (connected) quiver is of finite type if and only if its underlying graph (when the directions of the arrows are ignored) is one of the ADE Dynkin diagrams: A_{n}, D_{n}, E_{6}, E_{7}, E_{8}.
2. The indecomposable representations are in a one-to-one correspondence with the positive roots of the root system of the Dynkin diagram.

Dlab & Ringel (1973) found a generalization of Gabriel's theorem in which all Dynkin diagrams of finite dimensional semisimple Lie algebras occur. This was generalized to all quivers and their corresponding Kac–Moody algebras by Victor Kac.

== Reflexive quiver ==

Let a quiver $\Gamma$ have edge set $E,$ vertex set $V,$ and source and target functions $s,t:E\to V.$

A reflexive quiver is then a pair $(\Gamma, l: V \rightarrow E),$ where $\Gamma$ is as above, such that:

- $s \circ l = t \circ l = \mathrm{id}_{V}$.

So, for each vertex $x,$ the edge $l(x)$ is a loop from and to the vertex.

The loops of $\Gamma$ that form the set $\{l(x) \mid x \in V\}$ are called the distinguished loops of $\Gamma$.

As for quivers in general, reflexive quivers do not require edge composition to be defined. Small categories and multiplicative graphs can both be seen as reflexive quivers with additional structure.

== See also ==
- ADE classification
- Adhesive category
- Assembly theory
- Graph algebra
- Group ring
- Incidence algebra
- Quiver diagram
- Semi-invariant of a quiver
- Toric variety
- Derived noncommutative algebraic geometry - Quivers help encode the data of derived noncommutative schemes

== Sources ==
- Derksen, Harm; Weyman, Jerzy (February 2005), "Quiver Representations" (PDF), Notices of the American Mathematical Society, 52 (2)
- Dlab, Vlastimil; Ringel, Claus Michael (1973), On algebras of finite representation type, Carleton Mathematical Lecture Notes, vol. 2, Department of Mathematics, Carleton Univ., Ottawa, Ont., MR 0347907
- Crawley-Boevey, William (1992), Notes on Quiver Representations (PDF), Oxford University, archived from the original (PDF) on 2011-07-24
- Riehl, Emily (2017), Category Theory in Context, Courier Dover Publications, ISBN 978-0-486-82080-4
- Gabriel, Peter (1972), "Unzerlegbare Darstellungen. I", Manuscripta Mathematica, 6 (1): 71–103, doi:10.1007/BF01298413, ISSN 0025-2611, MR 0332887.
- Victor Kac, "Root systems, representations of quivers and invariant theory". Invariant theory (Montecatini, 1982), pp. 74–108, Lecture Notes in Math. 996, Springer-Verlag, Berlin 1983. ISBN 3-540-12319-9
- King, Alastair (1994), "Moduli of representations of finite-dimensional algebras", Quart. J. Math., 45 (180): 515–530, doi:10.1093/qmath/45.4.515
- Savage, Alistair (2006) [2005], "Finite-dimensional algebras and quivers", in Francoise, J.-P.; Naber, G. L.; Tsou, S.T. (eds.), Encyclopedia of Mathematical Physics, vol. 2, Elsevier, pp. 313–320, arXiv:math/0505082, Bibcode:2005math......5082S
- Simson, Daniel; Skowronski, Andrzej; Assem, Ibrahim (2007), Elements of the Representation Theory of Associative Algebras, Cambridge University Press, ISBN 978-0-521-88218-7
- Bernšteĭn, I. N.; Gelʹfand, I. M.; Ponomarev, V. A., "Coxeter functors, and Gabriel's theorem" (Russian), Uspekhi Mat. Nauk 28 (1973), no. 2(170), 19–33. Translation on Bernstein's website.
- Rosiak, Daniel (2022). Sheaf Theory through Examples. doi:10.7551/mitpress/12581.001.0001. ISBN 978-0-262-37042-4.
- Wells, Charles (2009). "Sketches: Outline with References" (PDF).
- Quiver at the nLab
