= Group ring =

Set of finitely supported functions from a group to a ring

In algebra, a group ring is a free module and at the same time a ring, constructed in a natural way from any given ring and any given group. As a free module, its ring of scalars is the given ring, and its basis is the set of elements of the given group. As a ring, its addition law is that of the free module and its multiplication extends "by linearity" the given group law on the basis. Less formally, a group ring is a generalization of a given group, by attaching to each element of the group a "weighting factor" from a given ring.

If the ring is commutative then the group ring is also referred to as a group algebra, for it is indeed an algebra over the given ring. A group algebra over a field has a further structure of a Hopf algebra; in this case, it is thus called a group Hopf algebra.

The apparatus of group rings is especially useful in the theory of group representations.

== Definition ==
Let $G$ be a group, written multiplicatively, and let $R$ be a ring. The group ring of $G$ over $R$, which we will denote by $R[G]$, or simply $RG$, is the set of mappings $f\colon G \to R$ of finite support ($f(g)$ is nonzero for only finitely many elements $g$), where the module scalar product $\alpha f$ of a scalar $\alpha$ in $R$ and a mapping $f$ is defined as the mapping $x \mapsto \alpha \cdot f(x)$, and the module group sum of two mappings $f$ and $g$ is defined as the mapping $x \mapsto f(x) + g(x)$. To turn the additive group $R[G]$ into a ring, we define the product of $f$ and $g$ to be the mapping

$$x\mapsto\sum_{uv=x}f(u)g(v)=\sum_{u\in G}f(u)g(u^{-1}x).$$

The summation is legitimate because $f$ and $g$ are of finite support, and the ring axioms are readily verified.

Some variations in the notation and terminology are in use. In particular, the mappings such as $f : G \to R$ are sometimes written as what are called "formal linear combinations of elements of $G$ with coefficients in $R$ ":

$$\sum_{g\in G}f(g) g,$$

or simply

$\sum_{g\in G}f_g g.$

Note that if the ring $R$ is in fact a field, then the module structure of the group ring $RG$ is in fact a vector space over $R$.

== Examples ==
1. Let G = C_{3}, the cyclic group of order 3, with generator $a$ and identity element 1_{G}. An element r of C[G] can be written as

$$r = z_0 1_G + z_1 a + z_2 a^2\,$$

where z_{0}, z_{1} and z_{2} are in C, the complex numbers. This is the same thing as a polynomial ring in variable $a$ such that $a^3=a^0=1$ i.e. C[G] is isomorphic to the ring C[$a$]/$(a^3-1)$

Writing a different element s as $s=w_0 1_G +w_1 a +w_2 a^2$, their sum is

$$r + s = (z_0+w_0) 1_G + (z_1+w_1) a + (z_2+w_2) a^2\,$$

and their product is

$$rs = (z_0w_0 + z_1w_2 + z_2w_1) 1_G  +(z_0w_1 + z_1w_0 + z_2w_2)a +(z_0w_2 + z_2w_0 + z_1w_1)a^2.$$

Notice that the identity element 1_{G} of G induces a canonical embedding of the coefficient ring (in this case C) into C[G]; however strictly speaking the multiplicative identity element of C[G] is 1⋅1_{G} where the first 1 comes from C and the second from G. The additive identity element is zero.

When G is a non-commutative group, one must be careful to preserve the order of the group elements (and not accidentally commute them) when multiplying the terms.

2. The ring of Laurent polynomials over a ring R is the group ring of the infinite cyclic group Z over R.

3. Let Q be the quaternion group with elements $\{e, \bar{e}, i, \bar{i}, j, \bar{j}, k, \bar{k}\}$. Consider the group ring RQ, where R is the set of real numbers. An arbitrary element of this group ring is of the form

$$x_1 \cdot e + x_2 \cdot \bar{e} + x_3 \cdot i + x_4 \cdot \bar{i} + x_5 \cdot j + x_6 \cdot \bar{j} + x_7 \cdot k + x_8 \cdot \bar{k}$$

where $x_i$ is a real number.

Multiplication, as in any other group ring, is defined based on the group operation. For example,

$$\begin{align} \big(3 \cdot e + \sqrt{2} \cdot i \big)\left(\frac{1}{2} \cdot \bar{j}\right) &= (3 \cdot e)\left(\frac{1}{2} \cdot \bar{j}\right) + (\sqrt{2} \cdot i)\left(\frac{1}{2} \cdot \bar{j}\right)\\
&= \frac{3}{2} \cdot \big((e)(\bar{j})\big) + \frac{\sqrt{2}}{2} \cdot \big((i)(\bar{j})\big)\\
&= \frac{3}{2} \cdot \bar{j} + \frac{\sqrt{2}}{2} \cdot \bar{k}
\end{align}.$$

Note that RQ is not the same as the skew field of quaternions over R. This is because the skew field of quaternions satisfies additional relations in the ring, such as $-1 \cdot i = -i$, whereas in the group ring RQ, $-1\cdot i$ is not equal to $1\cdot \bar{i}$. To be more specific, the group ring RQ has dimension 8 as a real vector space, while the skew field of quaternions has dimension 4 as a real vector space.

4. Another example of a non-abelian group ring is $\mathbb{Z}[\mathbb{S}_3]$ where $\mathbb{S}_3$ is the symmetric group on 3 letters. This is not an integral domain since we have $[1 - (12)]*[1+(12)] = 1 -(12)+(12) -(12)(12) = 1 - 1 = 0$ where the element $(12)\in \mathbb{S}_3$ is the transposition that swaps 1 and 2. Therefore the group ring need not be an integral domain even when the underlying ring is an integral domain.

== Some basic properties ==
Using 1 to denote the multiplicative identity of the ring R, and denoting the group unit by 1_{G}, the ring R[G] contains a subring isomorphic to R, and its group of invertible elements contains a subgroup isomorphic to G. For considering the indicator function of {1_{G}}, which is the vector f defined by

$$f(g)= 1\cdot 1_G + \sum_{g\not= 1_G}0 \cdot g= \mathbf{1}_{\{1_G\}}(g)=\begin{cases}
1 & g = 1_G \\
0 & g \ne 1_G
\end{cases},$$

the set of all scalar multiples of f is a subring of R[G] isomorphic to R. And if we map each element s of G to the indicator function of {s}, which is the vector f defined by

$$f(g)= 1\cdot s + \sum_{g\not= s}0 \cdot g= \mathbf{1}_{\{s\}}(g)=\begin{cases}
1 & g = s \\
0 & g \ne s
\end{cases}$$

the resulting mapping is an injective group homomorphism (with respect to multiplication, not addition, in R[G]).

If R and G are both commutative (i.e., R is commutative and G is an abelian group), R[G] is commutative.

If H is a subgroup of G, then R[H] is a subring of R[G]. Similarly, if S is a subring of R, S[G] is a subring of R[G].

If G is a finite group of order greater than 1, then R[G] always has zero divisors. For example, consider an element g of G of order |g| = m > 1. Then 1 − g is a zero divisor:
$$(1 - g)(1 + g+\cdots+g^{m-1}) = 1 - g^m = 1 - 1 =0.$$

For example, consider the group ring Z[S_{3}] and the element of order 3 g = (123). In this case,
$$(1 - (123))(1 + (123)+ (132)) = 1 - (123)^3 = 1 - 1 =0.$$
A related result: If the group ring $K[G]$ is prime, then G has no nonidentity finite normal subgroup (in particular, G must be infinite).

Proof: Considering the contrapositive, suppose $H$ is a nonidentity finite normal subgroup of $G$. Take $a = \sum_{h \in H} h$. Since $hH = H$ for any $h \in H$, we know $ha = a$, therefore $a^2 = \sum_{h \in H} h a = |H|a$. Taking $b = |H|\,1 - a$, we have $ab = 0$. By normality of $H$, $a$ commutes with a basis of $K[G]$, and therefore

$$aK[G]b=K[G]ab=0$$.

And we see that $a,b$ are not zero, which shows $K[G]$ is not prime. This shows the original statement.

== Group algebra over a finite group ==
Group algebras occur naturally in the theory of group representations of finite groups. The group algebra K[G] over a field K is essentially the group ring, with the field K taking the place of the ring. As a set and vector space, it is the free vector space on G over the field K. That is, for x in K[G],

$$x=\sum_{g\in G} a_g g.$$

The algebra structure on the vector space is defined using the multiplication in the group:

$$g \cdot h = gh,$$

where on the left, g and h indicate elements of the group algebra, while the multiplication on the right is the group operation (denoted by juxtaposition).

Because the above multiplication can be confusing, one can also write the basis vectors of K[G] as e_{g} (instead of g), in which case the multiplication is written as:

$$e_g \cdot e_h = e_{gh}.$$

=== Interpretation as functions ===
Thinking of the free vector space as K-valued functions on G, the algebra multiplication is convolution of functions.

While the group algebra of a finite group can be identified with the space of functions on the group, for an infinite group these are different. The group algebra, consisting of finite sums, corresponds to functions on the group that vanish for cofinitely many points; topologically (using the discrete topology), these correspond to functions with compact support.

However, the group algebra K[G] and the space of functions K^{G} := Hom(G, K) are dual: given an element of the group algebra

$$x = \sum_{g\in G} a_g g$$

and a function on the group f : G → K these pair to give an element of K via

$$(x,f) = \sum_{g\in G} a_g f(g),$$

which is a well-defined sum because it is finite.

=== Representations of a group algebra ===
Taking K[G] to be an abstract algebra, one may ask for representations of the algebra acting on a K-vector space V of dimension d. Such a representation

$$\tilde{\rho}:K[G]\rightarrow \mbox{End} (V)$$

is an algebra homomorphism from the group algebra to the algebra of endomorphisms of V, which is isomorphic to the ring of d × d matrices: $\mathrm{End}(V)\cong M_{d}(K)$. Equivalently, this is a left K[G]-module over the abelian group V.

Correspondingly, a group representation

$$\rho:G\rightarrow \mbox{Aut}(V),$$

is a group homomorphism from G to the group of linear automorphisms of V, which is isomorphic to the general linear group of invertible matrices: $\mathrm{Aut}(V)\cong \mathrm{GL}_d(K)$. Any such representation induces an algebra representation

$$\tilde{\rho}:K[G]\rightarrow \mbox{End}(V),$$

simply by letting $\tilde{\rho}(e_g) = \rho(g)$ and extending linearly. Thus, representations of the group correspond exactly to representations of the algebra, and the two theories are essentially equivalent.

=== Regular representation ===
The group algebra is an algebra over itself; under the correspondence of representations over R and R[G] modules, it is the regular representation of the group.

Written as a representation, it is the representation g ↦ ρ_{g} with the action given by $\rho(g)\cdot e_h = e_{gh}$, or

$$\rho(g)\cdot r =  \sum_{h\in G} k_h \rho(g)\cdot e_h = \sum_{h\in G} k_h e_{gh}.$$

=== Semisimple decomposition ===
The dimension of the vector space K[G] is just equal to the number of elements in the group. The field K is commonly taken to be the complex numbers C or the reals R, so that one discusses the group algebras C[G] or R[G].

The group algebra C[G] of a finite group over the complex numbers is a semisimple ring. This result, Maschke's theorem, allows us to understand C[G] as a finite product of matrix rings with entries in C. Indeed, if we list the complex irreducible representations of G as V_{k} for k = 1, . . . , m, these correspond to group homomorphisms $\rho_k: G\to \mathrm{Aut}(V_k)$ and hence to algebra homomorphisms $\tilde\rho_k: \mathbb{C}[G]\to \mathrm{End}(V_k)$. Assembling these mappings gives an algebra isomorphism

$$\tilde\rho : \mathbb{C}[G] \to \bigoplus_{k=1}^m \mathrm{End}(V_k)
\cong \bigoplus_{k=1}^m M_{d_k}(\mathbb{C}),$$

where d_{k} is the dimension of V_{k}. The subalgebra of C[G] corresponding to End(V_{k}) is the two-sided ideal generated by the idempotent

$$\epsilon_k = \frac{d_k}{|G|}\sum_{g\in G}\chi_k(g^{-1})\,g,$$

where $\chi_k(g)=\mathrm{tr}\,\rho_k(g)$ is the character of V_{k}. These form a complete system of orthogonal idempotents, so that $\epsilon_k^2 =\epsilon_k$, $\epsilon_j \epsilon_k = 0$ for j ≠ k, and $1 = \epsilon_1+\cdots+\epsilon_m$. The isomorphism $\tilde\rho$ is closely related to Fourier transform on finite groups.

For a more general field K, whenever the characteristic of K does not divide the order of the group G, then K[G] is semisimple. When G is a finite abelian group, the group ring K[G] is commutative, and its structure is easy to express in terms of roots of unity.

When K is a field of characteristic p which divides the order of G, the group ring is not semisimple: it has a non-zero Jacobson radical, and this gives the corresponding subject of modular representation theory its own, deeper character.

=== Center of a group algebra ===
The center of the group algebra is the set of elements that commute with all elements of the group algebra:

$$\mathrm{Z}(K[G]) := \left\{ z \in K[G] : \forall r \in K[G], zr = rz \right\}.$$

The center is equal to the set of class functions, that is the set of elements that are constant on each conjugacy class

$$\mathrm{Z}(K[G]) = \left\{ \sum_{g \in G} a_g g :  \forall g,h \in G, a_g = a_{h^{-1}gh}\right\}.$$

If K = C, the set of irreducible characters of G forms an orthonormal basis of Z(K[G]) with respect to the inner product

$$\left \langle \sum_{g \in G} a_g g, \sum_{g \in G} b_g g \right \rangle = \frac{1}{|G|} \sum_{g \in G} \bar{a}_g b_g.$$

== Group rings over an infinite group ==
Much less is known in the case where G is countably infinite, or uncountable, and this is an area of active research. The case where R is the field of complex numbers is probably the one best studied. In this case, Irving Kaplansky proved that if a and b are elements of C[G] with ab = 1, then ba = 1. Whether this is true if R is a field of positive characteristic remains unknown.

A long-standing conjecture of Kaplansky (~1940) says that if G is a torsion-free group, and K is a field, then the group ring K[G] has no non-trivial zero divisors. This conjecture is equivalent to K[G] having no non-trivial nilpotents under the same hypotheses for K and G.

In fact, the condition that K is a field can be relaxed to any ring that can be embedded into an integral domain.

The conjecture remains open in full generality, however some special cases of torsion-free groups have been shown to satisfy the zero divisor conjecture. These include:

- Unique product groups (e.g. orderable groups, in particular free groups)
- Elementary amenable groups (e.g. virtually abelian groups)
- Diffuse groups – in particular, groups that act freely isometrically on R-trees, and the fundamental groups of surface groups except for the fundamental groups of direct sums of one, two or three copies of the projective plane.

The case where G is a topological group is discussed in greater detail in the article Group algebra of a locally compact group.

== Category theory ==
=== Adjoint ===
Categorically, the group ring construction is left adjoint to "group of units"; the following functors are an adjoint pair:
$$\begin{align}
R[-]&\colon \mathbf{Grp} \to R\mathbf{\text{-}Alg}\\
(-)^\times&\colon R\mathbf{\text{-}Alg} \to \mathbf{Grp}
\end{align}$$
where $R[-]$ takes a group to its group ring over R, and $(-)^\times$ takes an R-algebra to its group of units.

When R = Z, this gives an adjunction between the category of groups and the category of rings, and the unit of the adjunction takes a group G to a group that contains trivial units: G × {±1} = {±g}. In general, group rings contain nontrivial units. If G contains elements a and b such that $a^n=1$ and b does not normalize $\langle a\rangle$ then the square of

$$x=(a-1)b \left (1+a+a^2+...+a^{n-1} \right )$$

is zero, hence $(1+x)(1-x)=1$. The element 1 + x is a unit of infinite order.

=== Universal property ===
The above adjunction expresses a universal property of group rings. Let R be a (commutative) ring, let G be a group, and let S be an R-algebra. For any group homomorphism $f:G\to S^\times$, there exists a unique R-algebra homomorphism $\overline{f}:R[G]\to S$ such that $\overline{f}^\times \circ i=f$ where i is the inclusion

$$\begin{align}
i:G &\longrightarrow R[G] \\
g &\longmapsto 1_Rg
\end{align}$$

In other words, $\overline{f}$ is the unique homomorphism making the following diagram commute:

Any other ring satisfying this property is canonically isomorphic to the group ring.

=== Hopf algebra ===
The group algebra K[G] has a natural structure of a Hopf algebra. The comultiplication is defined by $\Delta(g)=g\otimes g$, extended linearly, and the antipode is $S(g)=g^{-1}$, again extended linearly.

When equipped with this Hopf algebra structure, the group algebra construction is left adjoint to the "group-like elements" functor; the following functors are an adjoint pair:
$$\begin{align}
K[-]&\colon \mathbf{Grp} \to K\mathbf{\text{-}Hopf}\\
G(-)&\colon K\mathbf{\text{-}Hopf} \to \mathbf{Grp}
\end{align}$$
where $K[-]$ takes a group to its group Hopf algebra over K, and $G(-)$ takes a Hopf algebra to its group of group-like elements.

=== Generalizations ===
The group algebra generalizes to the monoid ring and thence to the category algebra, of which another example is the incidence algebra.

== Filtration ==
If a group has a length function – for example, if there is a choice of generators and one takes the word metric, as in Coxeter groups – then the group ring becomes a filtered algebra.

== See also ==
- Group algebra of a locally compact group
- Monoid ring
- Kaplansky's conjectures

=== Representation theory ===
- Group representation
- Regular representation

=== Category theory ===
- Category algebra
- Group of units
- Incidence algebra
- Quiver algebra
