= Representation theory of the Galilean group =

Representation theory of the symmetries of non-relativistic quantum space

In nonrelativistic quantum mechanics, an account can be given of the existence of mass and spin (normally explained in Wigner's classification of relativistic mechanics) in terms of the representation theory of the Galilean group, which is the spacetime symmetry group of nonrelativistic quantum mechanics.

== Background ==
In 3 + 1 dimensions, this is the subgroup of the affine group on (t, x, y, z), whose linear part leaves invariant both the metric (g_{μν} = diag(1, 0, 0, 0)) and the (independent) dual metric (g_{μν} = diag(0, 1, 1, 1)). A similar definition applies for n + 1 dimensions.

We are interested in projective representations of this group, which are equivalent to unitary representations of the nontrivial central extension of the universal covering group of the Galilean group by the one-dimensional Lie group R, cf. the article Galilean group for the central extension of its Lie algebra. The method of induced representations will be used to survey these.

== Lie algebra ==
We focus on the (centrally extended, Bargmann) Lie algebra here, because it is simpler to analyze and we can always extend the results to the full Lie group through the Frobenius theorem.

$$[E,P_i]=0$$
$$[P_i,P_j]=0$$
$$[L_{ij},E]=0$$
$$[C_i,C_j]=0$$
$$[L_{ij},L_{kl}]=i\hbar [\delta_{ik}L_{jl}-\delta_{il}L_{jk}-\delta_{jk}L_{il}+\delta_{jl}L_{ik}]$$
$$[L_{ij},P_k]=i\hbar[\delta_{ik}P_j-\delta_{jk}P_i]$$
$$[L_{ij},C_k]=i\hbar[\delta_{ik}C_j-\delta_{jk}C_i]$$
$$[C_i,E]=i\hbar P_i$$
$$[C_i,P_j]=i\hbar M\delta_{ij} ~.$$

E is the generator of time translations (Hamiltonian), P_{i} is the generator of translations (momentum operator), C_{i} is the generator of Galilean boosts, and L_{ij} stands for a generator of rotations (angular momentum operator).

=== Casimir invariants ===
The central charge M is a Casimir invariant.

The mass-shell invariant

$$ME-{P^2\over 2}$$

is an additional Casimir invariant.

In 3 + 1 dimensions, a third Casimir invariant is W^{2}, where

$$\vec{W} \equiv M \vec{L} + \vec{P}\times\vec{C}  ~,$$

somewhat analogous to the Pauli–Lubanski pseudovector of relativistic mechanics.

More generally, in n + 1 dimensions, invariants will be a function of

$$W_{ij} = M L_{ij} + P_i C_j - P_j C_i$$

and

$$W_{ijk} = P_i L_{jk} + P_j L_{ki} + P_k L_{ij}~,$$

as well as of the above mass-shell invariant and central charge.

=== Schur's lemma ===
Using Schur's lemma, in an irreducible unitary representation, all these Casimir invariants are multiples of the identity. Call these coefficients m and mE_{0} and (in the case of 3 + 1 dimensions) w, respectively. Recalling that we are considering unitary representations here, we see that these eigenvalues have to be real numbers.

Thus, m > 0, m = 0 and m < 0. (The last case is similar to the first.) In 3 + 1 dimensions, when In m > 0, we can write, w = ms for the third invariant, where s represents the spin, or intrinsic angular momentum. More generally, in n + 1 dimensions, the generators L and C will be related, respectively, to the total angular momentum and center-of-mass moment by

$$W_{ij} = M S_{ij}$$
$$L_{ij} = S_{ij} + X_i P_j - X_j P_i$$
$$C_i = M X_i - P_i t   ~.$$

From a purely representation-theoretic point of view, one would have to study all of the representations; but, here, we are only interested in applications to quantum mechanics. There, E represents the energy, which has to be bounded below, if thermodynamic stability is required. Consider first the case where m is nonzero.

Considering the (E, P→) space with the constraint
$$mE = mE_0 + {P^2 \over 2}~,$$
we see that the Galilean boosts act transitively on this hypersurface. In fact, treating the energy E as the Hamiltonian, differentiating with respect to P, and applying Hamilton's equations, we obtain the mass-velocity relation m v→ = P→.

The hypersurface is parametrized by this velocity In v→. Consider the stabilizer of a point on the orbit, (E_{0}, 0), where the velocity is 0. Because of transitivity, we know the unitary irrep contains a nontrivial linear subspace with these energy-momentum eigenvalues. (This subspace only exists in a rigged Hilbert space, because the momentum spectrum is continuous.)

=== Little group ===
The subspace is spanned by E, P→, M and L_{ij}. We already know how the subspace of the irrep transforms under all operators but the angular momentum. Note that the rotation subgroup is Spin(3). We have to look at its double cover, because we are considering projective representations. This is called the little group, a name given by Eugene Wigner. His method of induced representations specifies that the irrep is given by the direct sum of all the fibers in a vector bundle over the mE = mE_{0} + P^{2}/2 hypersurface, whose fibers are a unitary irrep of Spin(3).

Spin(3) is none other than SU(2). (See representation theory of SU(2), where it is shown that the unitary irreps of SU(2) are labeled by s, a non-negative integer multiple of one half. This is called spin, for historical reasons.)

- Consequently, for m ≠ 0, the unitary irreps are classified by m, E_{0} and a spin s.
- Looking at the spectrum of E, it is evident that if m is negative, the spectrum of E is not bounded below. Hence, only the case with a positive mass is physical.
- Now, consider the case m = 0. By unitarity,
  $$mE - {P^2 \over 2} = {-P^2 \over 2}$$

is nonpositive. Suppose it is zero. Here, it is also the boosts as well as the rotations that constitute the little group. Any unitary irrep of this little group also gives rise to a projective irrep of the Galilean group. As far as we can tell, only the case which transforms trivially under the little group has any physical interpretation, and it corresponds to the no-particle state, the vacuum.

The case where the invariant is negative requires additional comment. This corresponds to the representation class for m = 0 and non-zero P→. Extending the bradyon, luxon, tachyon classification from the representation theory of the Poincaré group to an analogous classification, here, one may term these states as synchrons. They represent an instantaneous transfer of non-zero momentum across a (possibly large) distance. Associated with them, by above, is a "time" operator

$$t=-{\vec{P}\cdot \vec{C} \over P^2} ~,$$

which may be identified with the time of transfer. These states are naturally interpreted as the carriers of instantaneous action-at-a-distance forces.

N.B. In the 3 + 1-dimensional Galilei group, the boost generator may be decomposed into

$$\vec{C} = {\vec{W}\times\vec{P} \over P^2} - \vec{P}t~,$$

with W→ playing a role analogous to helicity.

== See also ==
- Galilei-covariant tensor formulation
- Representation theory of the Poincaré group
- Wigner's classification
- Pauli–Lubanski pseudovector
- Representation theory of the diffeomorphism group
- Rotation operator
