= Galilei-covariant tensor formulation =

Tensor formulation of non-relativistic physics

The Galilei-covariant tensor formulation is a method for treating non-relativistic physics using the extended Galilei group as the representation group of the theory. It is constructed in the light cone of a five dimensional manifold.

Takahashi et al., in 1988, began a study of Galilean symmetry, where an explicitly covariant non-relativistic field theory could be developed. The theory is constructed in the light cone of a (4,1) Minkowski space. Previously, in 1985, Duval et al. constructed a similar tensor formulation in the context of Newton–Cartan theory. Some other authors also have developed a similar Galilean tensor formalism.

== Galilean manifold ==
The Galilei transformations are

$$\begin{align}
\mathbf{x}' &= R\mathbf{x} - \mathbf{v} t + \mathbf{a} \\
t' &= t + \mathbf{b}.
\end{align}$$

where $R$ stands for the three-dimensional Euclidean rotations, $\mathbf{v}$ is the relative velocity determining Galilean boosts, a stands for spatial translations and b, for time translations. Consider a free mass particle $m$; the mass shell relation is given by $p^2 - 2mE = 0$.

We can then define a 5-vector,

$$p^\mu = (p_x, p_y, p_z, m, E) = (p_i, m, E)$$,

with $i = 1, 2, 3$.

Thus, we can define a scalar product of the type

$$p_\mu p_\nu g^{\mu\nu} = p_i p_i - p_5 p_4 - p_4 p_5 = p^2 - 2mE = k,$$

where

$$g^{\mu\nu} = \pm \begin{pmatrix}
1 & 0 & 0 &  0 &  0\\
0 & 1 & 0 &  0 &  0\\
0 & 0 & 1 &  0 &  0\\
0 & 0 & 0 &  0 & -1\\
0 & 0 & 0 & -1 &  0
\end{pmatrix},$$

is the metric of the space-time, and $p_\nu g^{\mu\nu} = p^\mu$.

=== Extended Galilei algebra ===
A five dimensional Poincaré algebra leaves the metric $g^{\mu\nu}$ invariant,

$$\begin{align}[]
[P_\mu, P_\nu] &= 0, \\
\frac{1}{i}~[M_{\mu\nu}, P_\rho] &= g_{\mu\rho} P_\nu - g_{\nu\rho} P_\mu, \\
\frac{1}{i}~[M_{\mu\nu}, M_{\rho\sigma}] &= g_{\mu\rho} M_{\nu\sigma} - g_{\mu\sigma} M_{\nu\rho} - g_{\nu\rho} M_{\mu\sigma} + g_{\nu\sigma} M_{\mu\rho},
\end{align}$$

We can write the generators as

$$\begin{align}
J_i &= \frac{1}{2}\epsilon_{ijk}M_{jk}, \\
K_i &= M_{5i}, \\
C_i &= M_{4i}, \\
D &= M_{54}.
\end{align}$$

The non-vanishing commutation relations will then be rewritten as

$$\begin{align}
\left[J_i,J_j\right] &= i\epsilon_{ijk}J_k, \\
\left[J_i,C_j\right] &= i\epsilon_{ijk}C_k, \\
\left[D,K_i\right] &= iK_i, \\
\left[P_4,D\right] &= iP_4, \\
\left[P_i,K_j\right] &= i\delta_{ij}P_5, \\
\left[P_4,K_i\right] &= iP_i, \\
\left[P_5,D\right] &= -iP_5, \\[4pt]
\left[J_i,K_j\right] &= i\epsilon_{ijk}K_k, \\
\left[K_i,C_j\right] &= i\delta_{ij}D-i\epsilon_{ijk}J_k, \\
\left[C_i,D\right] &= iC_i, \\
\left[J_i,P_j\right] &= i\epsilon_{ijk}P_k, \\
\left[P_i,C_j\right] &= i\delta_{ij}P_4, \\
\left[P_5,C_i\right] &= iP_i.
\end{align}$$

An important Lie subalgebra is

$$\begin{align}[]
[P_4,P_i] &= 0 \\[]
[P_i,P_j] &= 0 \\[]
[J_i,P_4] &= 0 \\[]
[K_i,K_j] &= 0 \\
\left[J_i,J_j\right] &= i\epsilon_{ijk}J_k, \\
\left[J_i,P_j\right] &= i\epsilon_{ijk}P_k, \\
\left[J_i,K_j\right] &= i\epsilon_{ijk}K_k, \\
\left[P_4,K_i\right] &= iP_i, \\
\left[P_i,K_j\right] &= i\delta_{ij}P_5,
\end{align}$$

$P_4$ is the generator of time translations (Hamiltonian), P_{i} is the generator of spatial translations (momentum operator), $K_i$ is the generator of Galilean boosts, and $J_i$ stands for a generator of rotations (angular momentum operator). The generator $P_5$ is a Casimir invariant and $P^2-2P_4P_5$ is an additional Casimir invariant. This algebra is isomorphic to the extended Galilean Algebra in (3+1) dimensions with $P_5=-M$, The central charge, interpreted as mass, and $P_4=-H$.

The third Casimir invariant is given by $W_{\mu\,5}W^\mu{}_5$, where $W_{\mu\nu}=\epsilon_{\mu\alpha\beta\rho\nu}P^{\alpha}M^{\beta\rho}$ is a 5-dimensional analog of the Pauli–Lubanski pseudovector.

== Bargmann structures ==
In 1985 Duval, Burdet and Kunzle showed that four-dimensional Newton–Cartan theory of gravitation can be reformulated as Kaluza–Klein reduction of five-dimensional Einstein gravity along a null-like direction. The metric used is the same as the Galilean metric but with all positive entries

$$g^{\mu\nu} = \begin{pmatrix}1&0&0&0&0\\0&1&0&0&0\\0&0&1&0&0\\0&0&0&0&1\\0&0&0&1&0\end{pmatrix}.$$

This lifting is considered to be useful for non-relativistic holographic models. Gravitational models in this framework have been shown to precisely calculate the Mercury precession.

== See also ==
- Galilean group
- Representation theory of the Galilean group
- Lorentz group
- Poincaré group
- Pauli–Lubanski pseudovector
