= Wigner's classification =

Classification of irreducible representations of the Poincaré group

In mathematics and theoretical physics, Wigner's classification is a classification of the nonnegative $~ (~E \ge 0~)~$ energy irreducible unitary representations of the Poincaré group which have either finite or zero mass eigenvalues. (These unitary representations are infinite-dimensional; the group is not semisimple and it does not satisfy Weyl's theorem on complete reducibility.) It was introduced by Eugene Wigner, to classify particles and fields in physics—see the article particle physics and representation theory. It relies on the stabilizer subgroups of that group, dubbed the Wigner little groups of various mass states.

The Casimir invariants of the Poincaré group are $~ C_1 = P^\mu \, P_\mu ~ ,$ (Einstein notation) where P is the 4-momentum operator, and $~ C_2 = W^\alpha\, W_\alpha ~,$ where W is the Pauli–Lubanski pseudovector. The eigenvalues of these operators serve to label the representations. The first is associated with mass-squared and the second with helicity or spin.

The physically relevant representations may thus be classified according to whether

- $~ m > 0 ~;$
- $~ m = 0 ~$ but $~P_0 > 0 ~; \quad$ or whether
- $~ m = 0 ~$ with $~ P^\mu = 0 ~, \text{ for } \mu = 0, 1, 2, 3 ~.$

Wigner found that massless particles are fundamentally different from massive particles.

For the first case
Note that the eigenspace (see generalized eigenspaces of unbounded operators) associated with $~P = (m, 0, 0, 0 ) ~$ is a representation of SO(3).

In the ray interpretation, one can go over to Spin(3) instead. So, massive states are classified by an irreducible Spin(3) unitary representation that characterizes their spin, and a positive mass, m.

For the second case
Look at the stabilizer of
$$~ P = ( k, 0, 0, -k )~.$$

This is the double cover of SE(2) (see projective representation). We have two cases, one where irreps are described by an integral multiple of 1/2 called the helicity, and the other called the "continuous spin" representation.

For the third case
The only finite-dimensional unitary solution is the trivial representation called the vacuum.

== Massive scalar fields ==
As an example, let us visualize the irreducible unitary representation with $~ m > 0 ~,$ and $~ s = 0~.$ It corresponds to the space of massive scalar fields.

Let M be the hyperboloid sheet defined by:

$~ P_0^2 - P_1^2 - P_2^2 - P_3^2 = m^2 ~, \quad$ $~P_0 > 0~.$

The Minkowski metric restricts to a Riemannian metric on M, giving M the metric structure of a hyperbolic space, in particular it is the hyperboloid model of hyperbolic space, see geometry of Minkowski space for proof. The Poincare group P acts on M because (forgetting the action of the translation subgroup ℝ^{4} with addition inside P) it preserves the Minkowski inner product, and an element x of the translation subgroup ℝ^{4} of the Poincare group acts on $~ L^2(M) ~$ by multiplication by suitable phase multipliers $~ \exp \left( -i \vec{p} \cdot \vec{x} \right) ~,$ where $~ p \in M ~.$ These two actions can be combined in a clever way using induced representations to obtain an action of P acting on $~ L^2(M) ~,$ that combines motions of M and phase multiplication.

This yields an action of the Poincare group on the space of square-integrable functions defined on the hypersurface M in Minkowski space. These may be viewed as measures defined on Minkowski space that are concentrated on the set M defined by

$E^2 - P_1^2 - P_2^2 - P_3^2 = m^2~, \quad$ $~E ~\equiv~ P_0 > 0~.$

The Fourier transform (in all four variables) of such measures yields positive-energy, finite-energy solutions of the Klein–Gordon equation defined on Minkowski space, namely

$$\frac{\partial^2}{\partial t^2} \psi - \nabla^2 \psi + m^2 \psi = 0,$$

without physical units. In this way, the $~ m > 0, \quad s = 0 ~$ irreducible representation of the Poincare group is realized by its action on a suitable space of solutions of a linear wave equation.

== Theory of projective representations ==
Physically, one is interested in irreducible projective unitary representations of the Poincaré group. After all, two vectors in the quantum Hilbert space that differ by multiplication by a constant represent the same physical state. Thus, two unitary operators that differ by a multiple of the identity have the same action on physical states. Therefore, the unitary operators that represent Poincaré symmetry are only defined up to a constant—and therefore the group composition law need only hold up to a constant.

According to Bargmann's theorem, every projective unitary representation of the Poincaré group comes from an ordinary unitary representation of its universal cover, which is a double cover. (Bargmann's theorem applies because the double cover of the Poincaré group admits no non-trivial one-dimensional central extensions.)

Passing to the double cover is important because it allows for half-odd-integer spin cases. In the positive mass case, for example, the little group is SU(2) rather than SO(3); the representations of SU(2) then include both integer and half-odd-integer spin cases.

Since the general criterion in Bargmann's theorem was not known when Wigner did his classification, he needed to show by hand (§5 of the paper) that the phases can be chosen in the operators to reflect the composition law in the group, up to a sign, which is then accounted for by passing to the double cover of the Poincaré group.

== Further classification ==
Left out from this classification are tachyonic solutions, solutions with no fixed mass, infraparticles with no fixed mass, etc. Such solutions are of physical importance, when considering virtual states. A celebrated example is the case of deep inelastic scattering, in which a virtual space-like photon is exchanged between the incoming lepton and the incoming hadron. This justifies the introduction of transversely and longitudinally-polarized photons, and of the related concept of transverse and longitudinal structure functions, when considering these virtual states as effective probes of the internal quark and gluon contents of the hadrons. From a mathematical point of view, one considers the SO(2,1) group instead of the usual SO(3) group encountered in the usual massive case discussed above. This explains the occurrence of two transverse polarization vectors $~ \epsilon_T^{\lambda=1,2} ~$ and $~ \epsilon_L ~$ which satisfy $~ \epsilon_T^2 = -1 ~$ and $~ \epsilon_L^2 = +1 ~,$ to be compared with the usual case of a free $~Z_0~$ boson which has three polarization vectors $~\epsilon_T^\lambda \text{ for } \lambda = 1,2,3~;$ each of them satisfying $~ \epsilon_T ^2 = -1 ~.$

== Geometric approaches to Wigner little groups ==
=== Massless case, $\mathrm{SE}(2)$ ===
As aforewritten, for massless particles with lightlike momentum ($k^2=0$), the Wigner little group is a double cover of $\mathrm{SE}(2)$—the group of isometries of 2-dimensional Euclidean space. The geometric reasoning behind this fact was originally a mystery to Wigner, but has since been resolved. The answer to this mystery is best presented in the language of the spacetime algebra (STA), $\mathbb{G}_{1,3}=\mathbb{R}[\gamma_0,\gamma_1,\gamma_2,\gamma_3]$, which is the Clifford or geometric algebra of (1+3)-dimensional spacetime. It is generated by the orthonormal basis vectors ${\gamma_0,\gamma_1,\gamma_2,\gamma_3}$ satisfying the Minkowski metric,
$$\gamma_\mu\cdot\gamma_\nu = \frac{1}{2}(\gamma_\mu\gamma_\nu+\gamma_\nu\gamma_\mu)=\eta_{\mu\nu}.$$
The vectors are written with gammas as their matrix representation is given by the Dirac matrices. Without loss of generality: For a lightlike momentum vector $k=k_0(\gamma_0+\gamma_3)\in\mathbb{G}_{1,3}^1$ there exists some spacelike polarization vector $s=s_1\gamma_1+s_2\gamma_2$ satisfying $s\cdot k=0$. And for this $k$, there is a subset of the (spin) Lorentz group $\mathrm{Spin}(1,3)\subset\mathbb{G}_{1,3}$ that, for $\Lambda_k\in\mathrm{Spin}(1,3)$, satisfies
$$\Lambda_k k\Lambda^{-1}_k=k.$$
This is the defining relation of the massless little group that is a double cover of $\mathrm{SE}(2)$:
$$\mathrm{Spin}(0,2,1)/{\pm1}\approx\mathrm{SE}(2).$$
Elements of this group are exponentials of the Lie algebra generators, $J_3 = \gamma_{12},\quad N_1=\gamma_1(\gamma_0+\gamma_3),\quad N_2=\gamma_2(\gamma_0+\gamma_3).$ It follows that, when transforming under $\Lambda_J=\exp[{-\omega J_3/2}]$,
$$s'=\Lambda_J s\Lambda_J^{-1}=e^{-\frac{\omega}{2}\gamma_{12}}se^{\frac{\omega}{2}\gamma_{12}}.$$
Then, when transforming under $\Lambda_N=\exp{[-(\nu_1 N_1+\nu_2 N_2)/2]}$, and for appropriate real scalars $\alpha$ and $\beta$,
$$s''=\Lambda_N s\Lambda_N^{-1}=s-(\alpha s_2+\beta s_1)(\gamma_0+\gamma_3).$$
Thus the bivector $s\wedge k = sk$ is invariant under the little group transformation
$$\Lambda_N sk \Lambda_N^{-1}=s''k=sk,$$
but not invariant under
$$\Lambda_J sk \Lambda_J^{-1}=s'k\neq sk.$$
The transformations $\Lambda_N$ leave the bivector $sk$ invariant and are therefore not physically-realizable. It so happens that this bivector is algebraically equivalent to the electromagnetic field. This serves as a derivation of the electromagnetic field from the invariance of lightlike momentum, and proves that the only physically-realizable transformations within the massless little group are the rotations of
$$\Lambda_J\in\mathrm{Spin}(2)\approx\mathrm{U}(1)\subset\mathrm{Spin}(0,2,1).$$
Indeed, these are the helicity degrees of freedom for the photon.

Using the mirror view of geometry (also plane-based geometry)—wherein vectors represent hyperplanes—results in a direct geometric interpretation for the massless little group. The resulting pictures, when projectively modeled in relative 3-dimensional space show that the lightlike momentum vector $k$ is a plane tangent to the lightsphere while the spacelike polarization vector $s$ and its transformation $s'$ are planes orthogonal to $k$ and passing through the origin of the lightsphere. The bivector $sk$ is the intersection of the planes $s$ and $k$, which is a line tangent to the lightsphere. The physical-realizability of the subgroup $\mathrm{Spin}(2)$ is geometrically seen as a rotation of $sk$ into $s'k$ about the axis orthogonal to the plane $k$ and passing through the origin of the lightsphere. Said otherly, the physical-realizability is seen as the set of all lines tangent to the lightsphere at a specific point. The transformations of $s$ to $s''$ preserve the intersection line, and are therefore not physically-realizable; they are but gauge transformations.

== See also ==
- Induced representation – Process of extending a representation of a subgroup to the parent group
- Particle physics and representation theory – Physics-mathematics connection
- Pauli–Lubanski pseudovector – Operator in quantum field theory
- Representation theory of the diffeomorphism group – Representation theory of the symmetries of manifolds
- Representation theory of the Galilean group – Representation theory of the symmetries of non-relativistic quantum space
- Representation theory of the Poincaré group – Representation theory of an important group in physics
- System of imprimitivity
