= Relativistic angular momentum =

Angular momentum in special and general relativity

In physics, relativistic angular momentum encompasses to the mathematical formalisms and physical concepts that define angular momentum in special relativity (SR) and general relativity (GR). This relativistic quantity is subtly different from its classical mechanics counterpart.

Angular momentum is an important dynamical quantity derived from position and momentum. It is a measure of an object's rotational motion and resistance to changes in its rotation. Also, in the same way momentum conservation corresponds to translational symmetry, angular momentum conservation corresponds to rotational symmetry – the connection between symmetries and conservation laws is made by Noether's theorem. While these concepts were originally discovered in classical mechanics, they are also true and significant in special and general relativity. In terms of abstract algebra, the invariance of angular momentum, four-momentum, and other symmetries in spacetime, are described by the Lorentz group, or more generally the Poincaré group.

Physical quantities that remain separate in classical physics are naturally combined in SR and GR by enforcing the postulates of relativity. Most notably, the space and time coordinates combine into the four-position, and energy and momentum combine into the four-momentum. The components of these four-vectors depend on the frame of reference used, and change under Lorentz transformations to other inertial frames or accelerated frames.

Relativistic angular momentum is less obvious. The classical definition of angular momentum is the cross product of position x with momentum p to obtain a pseudovector x × p, or alternatively as the exterior product to obtain a second order antisymmetric tensor x ∧ p. What does this combine with, if anything? There is another vector quantity not often discussed – it is the time-varying moment of mass polar-vector (not the moment of inertia) related to the boost of the centre of mass of the system, and this combines with the classical angular momentum pseudovector to form an antisymmetric tensor of second order, in exactly the same way as the electric field polar-vector combines with the magnetic field pseudovector to form the electromagnetic field antisymmetric tensor. For rotating mass–energy distributions (such as gyroscopes, planets, stars, and black holes) instead of point-like particles, the angular momentum tensor is expressed in terms of the stress–energy tensor of the rotating object.

In special relativity alone, in the rest frame of a spinning object, there is an intrinsic angular momentum analogous to the "spin" in quantum mechanics and relativistic quantum mechanics, although for an extended body rather than a point particle. In relativistic quantum mechanics, elementary particles have spin and this is an additional contribution to the orbital angular momentum operator, yielding the total angular momentum tensor operator. In any case, the intrinsic "spin" addition to the orbital angular momentum of an object can be expressed in terms of the Pauli–Lubanski pseudovector.

== Definitions ==
The 3-angular momentum as a bivector (plane element) and axial vector, of a particle of mass m with instantaneous 3-position x and 3-momentum p.

=== Orbital 3d angular momentum ===
For reference and background, two closely related forms of angular momentum are given.

In classical mechanics, the orbital angular momentum of a particle with instantaneous three-dimensional position vector x = (x, y, z) and momentum vector p = (p_{x}, p_{y}, p_{z}), is defined as the axial vector
$$\mathbf{L} = \mathbf{x} \times \mathbf{p}$$
which has three components, that are systematically given by cyclic permutations of Cartesian directions (e.g. change x to y, y to z, z to x, repeat)
$$\begin{align}
L_x &= y p_z - z p_y \,, \\
L_y &= z p_x - x p_z \,, \\
L_z &= x p_y - y p_x \,.
\end{align}$$

A related definition is to conceive orbital angular momentum as a plane element. This can be achieved by replacing the cross product by the exterior product in the language of exterior algebra, and angular momentum becomes a contravariant second order antisymmetric tensor
$$\mathbf{L} = \mathbf{x}\wedge\mathbf{p}$$

or writing x = (x_{1}, x_{2}, x_{3}) = (x, y, z) and momentum vector p = (p_{1}, p_{2}, p_{3}) = (p_{x}, p_{y}, p_{z}), the components can be compactly abbreviated in tensor index notation
$$L^{ij} = x^i p^j - x^j p^i$$
where the indices i and j take the values 1, 2, 3. On the other hand, the components can be systematically displayed fully in a 3 × 3 antisymmetric matrix
$$\begin{align}
\mathbf{L} &= \begin{pmatrix}
L^{11} & L^{12} & L^{13} \\
L^{21} & L^{22} & L^{23} \\
L^{31} & L^{32} & L^{33} \\
\end{pmatrix} = \begin{pmatrix}
0      & L_{xy} & L_{xz} \\
L_{yx} & 0      & L_{yz} \\
L_{zx} & L_{zy} & 0
\end{pmatrix} = \begin{pmatrix}
0      & L_{xy}  & -L_{zx} \\
-L_{xy} & 0       &  L_{yz} \\
L_{zx} & -L_{yz} &  0
\end{pmatrix} \\
&= \begin{pmatrix}
0             &  xp_y - yp_x   & -(zp_x - xp_z) \\
-(xp_y - yp_x) &  0             &  yp_z - zp_y \\
zp_x - xp_z   & -(yp_z - zp_y) &  0
\end{pmatrix}
\end{align}$$

This quantity is additive, and for an isolated system, the total angular momentum of a system is conserved.

=== Dynamic mass moment ===
In classical mechanics, the three-dimensional quantity for a particle of mass m moving with velocity u
$$\mathbf{N} = m \left( \mathbf{x} - t \mathbf{u} \right) = m \mathbf{x} - t \mathbf{p}$$
has the dimensions of mass moment – length multiplied by mass. It is equal to the mass of the particle or system of particles multiplied by the distance from the space origin to the centre of mass (COM) at the time origin (t = 0), as measured in the lab frame. There is no universal symbol, nor even a universal name, for this quantity. Different authors may denote it by other symbols if any (for example μ), may designate other names, and may define N to be the negative of what is used here. The above form has the advantage that it resembles the familiar Galilean transformation for position, which in turn is the non-relativistic boost transformation between inertial frames.

This vector is also additive: for a system of particles, the vector sum is the resultant
$$\sum_n \mathbf{N}_n = \sum_n m_n \left(\mathbf{x}_n - t \mathbf{u}_n \right) = \left(\mathbf{x}_\mathrm{COM}\sum_n m_n - t \sum_n m_n \mathbf{u}_n \right)= M_\text{tot}(\mathbf{x}_{\mathrm{COM}}-\mathbf{u}_{\mathrm{COM}}t)$$
where the system's centre of mass position and velocity and total mass are respectively
$$\begin{align}
\mathbf{x}_\mathrm{COM} &= \frac{\sum_n m_n \mathbf{x}_n}{\sum_n m_n}, \\[3pt]
\mathbf{u}_\mathrm{COM} &= \frac{\sum_n m_n \mathbf{u}_n}{\sum_n m_n}, \\[3pt]
M_\text{tot} &= \sum_n m_n.
\end{align}$$

For an isolated system, N is conserved in time, which can be seen by differentiating with respect to time. The angular momentum L is a pseudovector, but N is an "ordinary" (polar) vector, and is therefore invariant under inversion.

The resultant N_{tot} for a multiparticle system has the physical visualization that, whatever the complicated motion of all the particles are, they move in such a way that the system's COM moves in a straight line. This does not necessarily mean all particles "follow" the COM, nor that all particles all move in almost the same direction simultaneously, only that the collective motion of the particles is constrained in relation to the centre of mass.

In special relativity, if the particle moves with velocity u relative to the lab frame, then
$$\begin{align}
E &= \gamma(\mathbf{u})m_0c^2, &
\mathbf{p} &= \gamma(\mathbf{u})m_0\mathbf{u}
\end{align}$$
where
$$\gamma (\mathbf{u}) = \frac{1}{\sqrt{1 - \frac{\mathbf{u}\cdot\mathbf{u}}{c^2}}}$$
is the Lorentz factor and m is the mass (i.e. the rest mass) of the particle. The corresponding relativistic mass moment in terms of m, u, p, E, in the same lab frame is
$$\mathbf{N} = \frac{E}{c^2}\mathbf{x} - \mathbf{p}t = m\gamma(\mathbf{u})(\mathbf{x} - \mathbf{u}t).$$

The Cartesian components are
$$\begin{align}
N_x = mx - p_xt &= \frac{E}{c^2}x - p_xt = m\gamma(u)(x - u_x t) \\
N_y = my - p_yt &= \frac{E}{c^2}y - p_yt = m\gamma(u)(y - u_y t) \\
N_z = mz - p_zt &= \frac{E}{c^2}z - p_zt = m\gamma(u)(z - u_z t)
\end{align}$$

== Special relativity ==
=== Coordinate transformations for a boost in the x direction ===
Consider a coordinate frame F′ which moves with velocity v = (v, 0, 0) relative to another frame F, along the direction of the coincident xx′ axes. The origins of the two coordinate frames coincide at times t = t′ = 0. The mass–energy E = mc^{2} and momentum components p = (p_{x}, p_{y}, p_{z}) of an object, as well as position coordinates x = (x, y, z) and time t in frame F are transformed to E′ = m′c^{2}, p′ = (p_{x}′, p_{y}′, p_{z}′), x′ = (x′, y′, z′), and t′ in F′ according to the Lorentz transformations
$$\begin{align}
t' &= \gamma(v) \left(t - \frac{vx}{c^2}\right) \,,\quad & E'   &= \gamma(v) \left(E - vp_x \right) \\
x' &= \gamma(v) (x - vt) \,,\quad                        & p_x' &= \gamma(v) \left(p_x - \frac{vE}{c^2}\right) \\
y' &= y \,,\quad                                         & p_y' &= p_y \\
z' &= z \,,\quad                                         & p_z' &= p_z \\
\end{align}$$

The Lorentz factor here applies to the velocity v, the relative velocity between the frames. This is not necessarily the same as the velocity u of an object.

For the orbital 3-angular momentum L as a pseudovector, we have
$$\begin{align}
L_x' &= y' p_z' - z' p_y' = L_x \\
L_y' &= z' p_x' - x' p_z' = \gamma(v) ( L_y - v N_z ) \\
L_z' &= x' p_y' - y' p_x' = \gamma(v) ( L_z + v N_y ) \\
\end{align}$$

Derivation

For the x-component
$$L_x' = y'p_z' - z'p_y' = yp_z - zp_y = L_x$$
the y-component
$$\begin{align}
L_y' &= z'p_x' - x'p_z'\\
&= z\gamma\left(p_x - \frac{vE}{c^2}\right) - \gamma\left(x - vt\right)p_z \\
&= \gamma\left[zp_x - z\frac{vE}{c^2} - xp_z + vtp_z\right] \\
&= \gamma\left[\left(zp_x - xp_z\right) + v\left(p_zt - z\frac{E}{c^2}\right)\right] \\
&= \gamma\left(L_y - vN_z\right)
\end{align}$$
and z-component
$$\begin{align}
L_z' &= x' p_y' - y' p_x'\\
&= \gamma\left(x - vt\right)p_y - y\gamma\left(p_x - \frac{vE}{c^2}\right)\\
&= \gamma\left[xp_y - vtp_y - yp_x + y\frac{vE}{c^2}\right]\\
&= \gamma\left[\left(xp_y - yp_x\right) + v\left(y\frac{E}{c^2} - tp_y\right)\right]\\
&= \gamma\left(L_z + vN_y\right)
\end{align}$$

In the second terms of L_{y}′ and L_{z}′, the y and z components of the cross product v × N can be inferred by recognizing cyclic permutations of v_{x} = v and v_{y} = v_{z} = 0 with the components of N,
$$\begin{align}
-v N_z &= v_z N_x - v_x N_z = \left(\mathbf{v} \times \mathbf{N}\right)_y \\
v N_y &= v_x N_y - v_y N_x = \left(\mathbf{v} \times \mathbf{N}\right)_z \\
\end{align}$$

Now, L_{x} is parallel to the relative velocity v, and the other components L_{y} and L_{z} are perpendicular to v. The parallel–perpendicular correspondence can be facilitated by splitting the entire 3-angular momentum pseudovector into components parallel (∥) and perpendicular (⊥) to v, in each frame,
$$\mathbf{L} = \mathbf{L}_\parallel + \mathbf{L}_\perp \,,\quad \mathbf{L}' = \mathbf{L}_\parallel' + \mathbf{L}_\perp'\,.$$

Then the component equations can be collected into the pseudovector equations
$$\begin{align}
\mathbf{L}_\parallel' &= \mathbf{L}_\parallel \\
\mathbf{L}_\perp' &= \gamma(\mathbf{v})\left(\mathbf{L}_\perp + \mathbf{v} \times \mathbf{N} \right) \\
\end{align}$$

Therefore, the components of angular momentum along the direction of motion do not change, while the components perpendicular do change. By contrast to the transformations of space and time, time and the spatial coordinates change along the direction of motion, while those perpendicular do not.

These transformations are true for all v, not just for motion along the xx′ axes.

Considering L as a tensor, we get a similar result
$$\mathbf{L}_\perp' = \gamma(\mathbf{v})\left(\mathbf{L}_\perp + \mathbf{v} \wedge \mathbf{N} \right)$$
where
$$\begin{align}
v_z N_x - v_x N_z &= \left(\mathbf{v}\wedge\mathbf{N}\right)_{zx} \\
v_x N_y - v_y N_x &= \left(\mathbf{v}\wedge\mathbf{N}\right)_{xy} \\
\end{align}$$

The boost of the dynamic mass moment along the x direction is
$$\begin{align}
N_x' &= m' x' - p_x' t' = N_x \\
N_y' &= m' y' - p_y' t' = \gamma(v)\left(N_y + \frac{v L_z}{c^2}\right) \\
N_z' &= m' z' - p_z' t' = \gamma(v)\left(N_z - \frac{v L_y}{c^2}\right) \\
\end{align}$$

Derivation

For the x-component
$$\begin{align}
N_x' &= \frac{E'}{c^2}x' - t'p_x'\\
&= \frac{\gamma}{c^2}(E - vp_x)\gamma(x - vt) - \gamma\left(t - \frac{xv}{c^2}\right)\gamma\left(p_x - \frac{vE}{c^2}\right) \\
&= \gamma^2\left[\frac{1}{c^2}\left(E - vp_x\right)(x - vt) - \left(t - \frac{xv}{c^2}\right)\left(p_x - \frac{vE}{c^2}\right)\right] \\
&= \gamma^2\left[\frac{Ex}{c^2} - \frac{Evt}{c^2} - \frac{vp_x x}{c^2} + \frac{vp_xvt}{c^2} - tp_x + \frac{xv}{c^2}p_x + t\frac{vE}{c^2} - \frac{xv}{c^2}\frac{vE}{c^2}\right] \\
&= \gamma^2\left[\frac{Ex}{c^2}\cancel{-\frac{Evt}{c^2}}\cancel{-\frac{vp_xx}{c^2}} + \frac{v^2}{c^2}p_xt - tp_x\cancel{+\frac{xv}{c^2}p_x}\cancel{+t\frac{vE}{c^2}} - \frac{v^2}{c^2}\frac{Ex}{c^2}\right] \\
&= \gamma^2\left[\left(\frac{Ex}{c^2} - tp_x\right) + \frac{v^2}{c^2}\left(p_xt - \frac{Ex}{c^2}\right)\right] \\
&= \gamma^2\left[1 - \frac{v^2}{c^2}\right]N_x \\
&= \gamma^2\frac{1}{\gamma^2}N_x
\end{align}$$
the y-component
$$\begin{align}
N_y' &= \frac{E'}{c^2}y' - t'p_y' \\
&= \frac{1}{c^2}\gamma(E - vp_x)y - \gamma\left(t - \frac{xv}{c^2}\right)p_y \\
&= \gamma\left[\frac{1}{c^2}(E - vp_x)y - \left(t - \frac{xv}{c^2}\right)p_y\right] \\
&= \gamma\left[\frac{1}{c^2}Ey - \frac{1}{c^2}vp_x y - tp_y + \frac{xv}{c^2}p_y\right] \\
&= \gamma\left[\left(\frac{1}{c^2}Ey - tp_y\right) + \frac{v}{c^2}(xp_y - yp_x)\right] \\
&= \gamma\left(N_y + \frac{v}{c^2}L_z\right)
\end{align}$$
and z-component
$$\begin{align}
N_z' &= \frac{E'}{c^2}z' - t'p_z' \\
&= \frac{1}{c^2}\gamma(E-vp_x)z - \gamma\left(t - \frac{xv}{c^2}\right)p_z\\
&= \gamma\left[\frac{1}{c^2}(E - vp_x)z - \left(t - \frac{xv}{c^2}\right)p_z\right]\\
&= \gamma\left[\frac{1}{c^2}Ez - \frac{1}{c^2}vp_z z - tp_z + \frac{xv}{c^2}p_z\right]\\
&= \gamma\left[\left(\frac{1}{c^2}Ez - tp_z\right) + \frac{v}{c^2}(xp_z - zp_x)\right]\\
&= \gamma\left(N_z - \frac{v}{c^2}L_y\right)
\end{align}$$

Collecting parallel and perpendicular components as before
$$\begin{align}
\mathbf{N}_\parallel' &= \mathbf{N}_\parallel \\
\mathbf{N}_\perp' &= \gamma(\mathbf{v})\left(\mathbf{N}_\perp - \frac{1}{c^2}\mathbf{v}\times\mathbf{L}\right)\\
\end{align}$$

Again, the components parallel to the direction of relative motion do not change, those perpendicular do change.

=== Vector transformations for a boost in any direction ===
So far these are only the parallel and perpendicular decompositions of the vectors. The transformations on the full vectors can be constructed from them as follows (throughout here L is a pseudovector for concreteness and compatibility with vector algebra).

Introduce a unit vector in the direction of v, given by n = v/v. The parallel components are given by the vector projection of L or N into n
$$\mathbf{L}_\parallel = (\mathbf{L}\cdot\mathbf{n})\mathbf{n} \,, \quad \mathbf{N}_\parallel = (\mathbf{N}\cdot\mathbf{n})\mathbf{n}$$
while the perpendicular component by vector rejection of L or N from n
$$\mathbf{L}_\perp = \mathbf{L} - (\mathbf{L}\cdot\mathbf{n})\mathbf{n} \,, \quad \mathbf{N}_\perp = \mathbf{N} - (\mathbf{N}\cdot\mathbf{n})\mathbf{n}$$
and the transformations are
$$\begin{align}
\mathbf{L}' &= \gamma(\mathbf{v})(\mathbf{L} + v\mathbf{n}\times\mathbf{N}) - (\gamma(\mathbf{v}) - 1)(\mathbf{L}\cdot\mathbf{n})\mathbf{n} \\
\mathbf{N}' &= \gamma(\mathbf{v})\left(\mathbf{N} - \frac{v}{c^2}\mathbf{n}\times\mathbf{L}\right) - (\gamma(\mathbf{v}) - 1)(\mathbf{N}\cdot\mathbf{n})\mathbf{n} \\
\end{align}$$
or reinstating v = vn,
$$\begin{align}
\mathbf{L}' &= \gamma(\mathbf{v})(\mathbf{L} + \mathbf{v}\times\mathbf{N}) - (\gamma(\mathbf{v}) - 1)\frac{(\mathbf{L}\cdot\mathbf{v})\mathbf{v}}{v^2} \\
\mathbf{N}' &= \gamma(\mathbf{v})\left(\mathbf{N} - \frac{1}{c^2}\mathbf{v}\times\mathbf{L}\right) - (\gamma(\mathbf{v}) - 1)\frac{(\mathbf{N}\cdot\mathbf{v})\mathbf{v}}{v^2} \\
\end{align}$$

These are very similar to the Lorentz transformations of the electric field E and magnetic field B, see Classical electromagnetism and special relativity.

Alternatively, starting from the vector Lorentz transformations of time, space, energy, and momentum, for a boost with velocity v,
$$\begin{align}
t' &= \gamma(\mathbf{v})\left(t - \frac{\mathbf{v}\cdot\mathbf{r}}{c^2}\right)\,,\\
\mathbf{r}' &= \mathbf{r} + \frac{\gamma(\mathbf{v}) - 1}{v^2}(\mathbf{r}\cdot\mathbf{v})\mathbf{v} - \gamma(\mathbf{v}) t\mathbf{v}\,,\\
\mathbf{p}' &= \mathbf{p} + \frac{\gamma(\mathbf{v}) - 1}{v^2}(\mathbf{p}\cdot\mathbf{v})\mathbf{v} - \gamma(\mathbf{v})\frac{E}{c^2}\mathbf{v}\,,\\
E' &= \gamma(\mathbf{v})\left(E - \mathbf{v}\cdot\mathbf{p}\right)\,,\\
\end{align}$$
inserting these into the definitions
$$\begin{align}
\mathbf{L}' &= \mathbf{r}'\times\mathbf{p}' \,, &
\mathbf{N}' &= \frac{E'}{c^2}\mathbf{r}' - t'\mathbf{p}'
\end{align}$$
gives the transformations.

Derivation of vector transformations directly

The orbital angular momentum in each frame are
$$\mathbf{L}'=\mathbf{r}'\times\mathbf{p}' \,,\quad \mathbf{L}=\mathbf{r}\times\mathbf{p}$$
so taking the cross product of the transformations
$$\begin{align}
\mathbf{L}' &= \left[\mathbf{r} + (\gamma - 1)(\mathbf{r}\cdot\mathbf{n})\mathbf{n} - \gamma tv\mathbf{n}\right] \times \left[\mathbf{p} + (\gamma - 1)(\mathbf{p}\cdot\mathbf{n})\mathbf{n}-\gamma\frac{E}{c^2}v\mathbf{n}\right]\\
&= [\mathbf{r} + (\gamma-1)(\mathbf{r}\cdot\mathbf{n})\mathbf{n} - \gamma tv\mathbf{n}]\times\mathbf{p} + (\gamma - 1)(\mathbf{p}\cdot\mathbf{n})[\mathbf{r} + (\gamma - 1)(\mathbf{r}\cdot\mathbf{n})\mathbf{n} - \gamma tv\mathbf{n}]\times\mathbf{n} - \gamma\frac{E}{c^2}v[\mathbf{r} + (\gamma - 1)(\mathbf{r}\cdot\mathbf{n})\mathbf{n} - \gamma tv\mathbf{n}]\times\mathbf{n}\\
&= \mathbf{r}\times\mathbf{p} + (\gamma - 1)(\mathbf{r}\cdot\mathbf{n})\mathbf{n}\times\mathbf{p} - \gamma tv\mathbf{n}\times\mathbf{p} + (\gamma - 1)(\mathbf{p}\cdot\mathbf{n})\mathbf{r}\times\mathbf{n} - \gamma\frac{E}{c^2}v\mathbf{r}\times\mathbf{n}\\
&= \mathbf{L} + \left[\frac{\gamma - 1}{v^2}(\mathbf{r}\cdot\mathbf{v}) - \gamma t\right]\mathbf{v}\times\mathbf{p} + \left[\frac{\gamma - 1}{v^2}(\mathbf{p}\cdot\mathbf{v}) - \gamma\frac{E}{c^2}\right]\mathbf{r}\times\mathbf{v}\\
&= \mathbf{L} + \mathbf{v}\times\left[\left(\frac{\gamma - 1}{v^2}(\mathbf{r}\cdot\mathbf{v}) - \gamma t\right)\mathbf{p} - \left(\frac{\gamma - 1}{v^2}(\mathbf{p}\cdot\mathbf{v}) - \gamma\frac{E}{c^2}\right)\mathbf{r}\right]\\
&= \mathbf{L} + \mathbf{v}\times\left[\frac{\gamma - 1}{v^2}\left((\mathbf{r}\cdot\mathbf{v})\mathbf{p} - (\mathbf{p}\cdot\mathbf{v})\mathbf{r}\right) + \gamma\left(\frac{E}{c^2}\mathbf{r} - t\mathbf{p}\right)\right]
\end{align}$$

Using the triple product rule
$$\begin{align}
\mathbf{a}\times(\mathbf{b}\times\mathbf{c}) &= \mathbf{b}(\mathbf{a}\cdot\mathbf{c}) - \mathbf{c}(\mathbf{a}\cdot\mathbf{b}) \\
(\mathbf{a}\times\mathbf{b})\times\mathbf{c} &= (\mathbf{c}\cdot\mathbf{a})\mathbf{b} - (\mathbf{c}\cdot\mathbf{b})\mathbf{a} \\
\end{align}$$
gives
$$\begin{align}
(\mathbf{r}\times\mathbf{p})\times\mathbf{v} &= (\mathbf{v}\cdot\mathbf{r})\mathbf{p} - (\mathbf{v}\cdot\mathbf{p})\mathbf{r}\\
(\mathbf{v}\cdot\mathbf{r})\mathbf{p} - (\mathbf{v}\cdot\mathbf{p})\mathbf{r} &= \mathbf{L}\times\mathbf{v}\\
\end{align}$$
and along with the definition of N we have
$$\mathbf{L}' = \mathbf{L} + \mathbf{v} \times \left[\frac{\gamma - 1}{v^2}\mathbf{L}\times\mathbf{v} + \gamma\mathbf{N}\right]$$

Reinstating the unit vector n,
$$\mathbf{L}' = \mathbf{L} + \mathbf{n}\times\left[(\gamma - 1)\mathbf{L}\times\mathbf{n} + v\gamma\mathbf{N}\right]$$

Since in the transformation there is a cross product on the left with n,
$$\mathbf{n}\times(\mathbf{L}\times\mathbf{n}) = \mathbf{L}(\mathbf{n}\cdot\mathbf{n})-\mathbf{n}(\mathbf{n}\cdot\mathbf{L}) = \mathbf{L} - \mathbf{n}(\mathbf{n}\cdot\mathbf{L})$$
then
$$\mathbf{L}' = \mathbf{L} + (\gamma-1)(\mathbf{L} - \mathbf{n}(\mathbf{n}\cdot\mathbf{L})) + \beta\gamma c\mathbf{n}\times\mathbf{N} = \gamma(\mathbf{L} + v\mathbf{n}\times\mathbf{N}) - (\gamma - 1)\mathbf{n}(\mathbf{n}\cdot\mathbf{L})$$

=== 4d angular momentum as a bivector ===
In relativistic mechanics, the COM boost and orbital 3-space angular momentum of a rotating object are combined into a four-dimensional bivector in terms of the four-position X and the four-momentum P of the object
$$\mathbf{M} = \mathbf{X}\wedge\mathbf{P}$$

In components
$$M^{\alpha\beta} = X^\alpha P^\beta - X^\beta P^\alpha$$
which are six independent quantities altogether. Since the components of X and P are frame-dependent, so is M. Three components
$$M^{ij} = x^i p^j - x^j p^i = L^{ij}$$
are those of the familiar classical 3-space orbital angular momentum, and the other three
$$M^{0i} = x^0 p^i - x^i p^0 = c\,\left(t p^i - x^i \frac{E}{c^2} \right) = - c N^i$$
are the relativistic mass moment, multiplied by −c. The tensor is antisymmetric;
$$M^{\alpha\beta} = -M^{\beta\alpha}$$

The components of the tensor can be systematically displayed as a matrix
$$\begin{align}
\mathbf{M}
&= \begin{pmatrix}
M^{00} & M^{01} & M^{02} & M^{03} \\
M^{10} & M^{11} & M^{12} & M^{13} \\
M^{20} & M^{21} & M^{22} & M^{23} \\
M^{30} & M^{31} & M^{32} & M^{33}
\end{pmatrix} \\[3pt]
&= \left(\begin{array}{c|ccc}
0     & -N^1 c  & -N^2 c  & -N^3 c \\ \hline
N^1 c &  0      &  L^{12} & -L^{31} \\
N^2 c & -L^{12} &  0      &  L^{23} \\
N^3 c &  L^{31} & -L^{23} &  0
\end{array}\right) \\[3pt]
&= \left(\begin{array}{c|c}
0                       & -\mathbf{N} c \\ \hline
\mathbf{N}^\mathrm{T} c &  \mathbf{x}\wedge\mathbf{p} \\
\end{array}\right)
\end{align}$$
in which the last array is a block matrix formed by treating N as a row vector which matrix transposes to the column vector N^{T}, and x ∧ p as a 3 × 3 antisymmetric matrix. The lines are merely inserted to show where the blocks are.

Again, this tensor is additive: the total angular momentum of a system is the sum of the angular momentum tensors for each constituent of the system:
$$\mathbf{M}_\text{tot} = \sum_n \mathbf{M}_n = \sum_n \mathbf{X}_n \wedge \mathbf{P}_n \,.$$

Each of the six components forms a conserved quantity when aggregated with the corresponding components for other objects and fields.

The angular momentum tensor M is indeed a tensor, the components change according to a Lorentz transformation matrix Λ, as illustrated in the usual way by tensor index notation
$$\begin{align}
{M'}^{\alpha\beta} &= {X'}^\alpha {P'}^\beta - {X'}^\beta {P'}^\alpha \\
&= {\Lambda^\alpha}_\gamma X^\gamma {\Lambda^\beta}_\delta P^\delta - {\Lambda^\beta}_\delta X^\delta {\Lambda^\alpha}_\gamma P^\gamma \\
&= {\Lambda^\alpha}_\gamma {\Lambda^\beta}_\delta \left( X^\gamma P^\delta - X^\delta P^\gamma \right) \\
&= {\Lambda^\alpha}_\gamma {\Lambda^\beta}_\delta M^{\gamma \delta}  \\
\end{align} ,$$
where, for a boost (without rotations) with normalized velocity β = v/c, the Lorentz transformation matrix elements are
$$\begin{align}
{\Lambda^0}_0 &= \gamma \\
{\Lambda^i}_0 &= {\Lambda^0}_i = -\gamma \beta^i \\
{\Lambda^i}_j &= {\delta^i}_j + \frac{\gamma - 1}{\beta^2} \beta^i\beta_j
\end{align}$$
and the covariant β_{i} and contravariant β^{i} components of β are the same since these are just parameters.

In other words, one can Lorentz-transform the four position and four momentum separately, and then antisymmetrize those newly found components to obtain the angular momentum tensor in the new frame.

Vector transformations derived from the tensor transformations

The transformation of boost components are

$$\begin{align}
M'^{k0} &= {\Lambda^k}_\mu {\Lambda^0}_\nu M^{\mu\nu}\\
&= {\Lambda^k}_0{\Lambda^0}_0 M^{00} + {\Lambda^k}_i {\Lambda^0}_0 M^{i0} + {\Lambda^k}_0 {\Lambda^0}_j M^{0j} + {\Lambda^k}_i {\Lambda^0}_j M^{ij} \\
&= \left({\Lambda^k}_i {\Lambda^0}_0 - {\Lambda^k}_0 {\Lambda^0}_i\right) M^{i0} + {\Lambda^k}_i {\Lambda^0}_j M^{ij} \\
\end{align}$$
as for the orbital angular momentum
$$\begin{align}
{M'}^{k\ell} &= {\Lambda^k}_\mu {\Lambda^\ell}_\nu M^{\mu\nu} \\
&= {\Lambda^k}_0 {\Lambda^\ell}_0 M^{00} + {\Lambda^k}_i {\Lambda^\ell}_0 M^{i0} + {\Lambda^k}_0 {\Lambda^\ell}_j M^{0j} + {\Lambda^k}_i {\Lambda^\ell}_j M^{ij} \\
&= \left({\Lambda^k}_i {\Lambda^\ell}_0 - {\Lambda^k}_0 {\Lambda^\ell}_i\right) M^{i0} + {\Lambda^k}_i {\Lambda^\ell}_j M^{ij}
\end{align}$$

The expressions in the Lorentz transformation entries are
$$\begin{align}
{\Lambda^k}_i {\Lambda^\ell}_0 - {\Lambda^k}_0 {\Lambda^\ell}_i
&= \left[{\delta^k}_i + \frac{\gamma - 1}{\beta^2}\beta^k\beta_i\right]\left(-\gamma\beta^\ell\right) -
\left(-\gamma\beta^k\right)\left[{\delta^\ell}_i + \frac{\gamma - 1}{\beta^2} \beta^\ell \beta_i\right] \\
&= \gamma\left[\beta^k {\delta^\ell}_i - \beta^\ell {\delta^k}_i\right] \\
{\Lambda^k}_i {\Lambda^0}_0 - {\Lambda^k}_0 {\Lambda^0}_i
&= \left[{\delta^k}_i + \frac{\gamma - 1}{\beta^2} \beta^k \beta_i\right]\gamma - (-\gamma\beta^k)(-\gamma\beta^i) \\
&= \gamma\left[{\delta^k}_i + \frac{\gamma - 1}{\beta^2}\beta^k \beta_i - \gamma\beta^k \beta^i\right] \\
&= \gamma\left[{\delta^k}_i + \left(\frac{\gamma - 1}{\beta^2} - \gamma\right)\beta^k \beta_i\right] \\
&= \gamma\left[{\delta^k}_i + \left(\frac{\gamma - \gamma\beta^2 - 1}{\beta^2}\right)\beta^k \beta_i\right] \\
&= \gamma\left[{\delta^k}_i + \left(\frac{\gamma^{-1} - 1}{\beta^2}\right)\beta^k \beta_i\right] \\
&= \gamma{\delta^k}_i - \left[\frac{\gamma - 1}{\beta^2}\right]\beta^k \beta_i \\
{\Lambda^k}_i {\Lambda^\ell}_j
&= \left[{\delta^k}_i + \frac{\gamma - 1}{\beta^2}\beta^k \beta_i\right]\left[{\delta^\ell}_j + \frac{\gamma - 1}{\beta^2}\beta^\ell \beta_j\right] \\
&= {\delta^k}_i {\delta^\ell}_j + \frac{\gamma - 1}{\beta^2}{\delta^k}_i \beta^\ell \beta_j + \frac{\gamma - 1}{\beta^2}\beta^k \beta_i {\delta^\ell}_j +
\frac{\gamma - 1}{\beta^2}\frac{\gamma - 1}{\beta^2}\beta^\ell \beta_j \beta^k \beta_i
\end{align}$$
gives
$$\begin{align}
cN'^k &= \left({\Lambda^k}_i {\Lambda^0}_0 - {\Lambda^k}_0 {\Lambda^0}_i\right)cN^i + {\Lambda^k}_i {\Lambda^0}_j \varepsilon^{ijn} L_n \\
&= \left[\gamma{\delta^k}_i - \left(\frac{\gamma - 1}{\beta^2}\right)\beta^k \beta_i\right] cN^i +
-\gamma\beta^j \left[{\delta^k}_i + \frac{\gamma - 1}{\beta^2}\beta^k \beta_i\right] \varepsilon^{ijn} L_n \\
&= \gamma cN^k -\left(\frac{\gamma - 1}{\beta^2}\right)\beta^k \left(\beta_i cN^i\right) -
\gamma\beta^j {\delta^k}_i \varepsilon^{ijn} L_n - \gamma\frac{\gamma - 1}{\beta^2}\beta^j \beta^k \beta_i \varepsilon^{ijn} L_n \\
&= \gamma cN^k -\left(\frac{\gamma - 1}{\beta^2}\right)\beta^k \left(\beta_i cN^i\right) - \gamma\beta^j \varepsilon^{kjn} L_n \\
\end{align}$$
or in vector form, dividing by c
$$\mathbf{N}' = \gamma \mathbf{N} -\left(\frac{\gamma - 1}{\beta^2}\right)\boldsymbol{\beta} \left(\boldsymbol{\beta}\cdot \mathbf{N}\right) - \frac{1}{c}\gamma \boldsymbol{\beta}\times\mathbf{L}$$
or reinstating β = v/c,
$$\mathbf{N}' = \gamma \mathbf{N} - \left(\frac{\gamma - 1}{v^2}\right)\mathbf{v} \left(\mathbf{v} \cdot \mathbf{N}\right) - \gamma\mathbf{v}\times\mathbf{L}$$
and
$$\begin{align}
L'^{k\ell} &= \left({\Lambda^k}_i {\Lambda^\ell}_0 - {\Lambda^k}_0 {\Lambda^\ell}_i\right)cN^i + {\Lambda^k}_i {\Lambda^\ell}_j L^{ij} \\
&= \gamma c \left(\beta^k {\delta^\ell}_i - \beta^\ell {\delta^k}_i\right) N^i +
\left[{\delta^k}_i {\delta^\ell}_j + \frac{\gamma - 1}{\beta^2}{\delta^k}_i \beta^\ell \beta_j +
\frac{\gamma - 1}{\beta^2}\beta^k \beta_i {\delta^\ell}_j +
\frac{\gamma - 1}{\beta^2}\frac{\gamma - 1}{\beta^2}\beta^\ell \beta_j \beta^k \beta_i\right] L^{ij} \\
&= \gamma c \left(\beta^k N^\ell -\beta^\ell N^k\right) + L^{k\ell} + \frac{\gamma - 1}{\beta^2} \beta^\ell \beta_j L^{kj} + \frac{\gamma - 1}{\beta^2}\beta^k \beta_i L^{i\ell} \\
\end{align}$$
or converting to pseudovector form
$$\begin{align}
\varepsilon^{k\ell n}L'_n &= \gamma c \left(\beta^k N^\ell - \beta^\ell N^k\right) + \varepsilon^{k\ell n}L_n + \frac{\gamma - 1}{\beta^2} \left(\beta^\ell \beta_j \varepsilon^{kjn} L_n - \beta^k \beta_i \varepsilon^{\ell i n} L_n \right) \\
\end{align}$$
in vector notation
$$\mathbf{L}' = \gamma c \boldsymbol{\beta}\times\mathbf{N} + \mathbf{L} + \frac{\gamma - 1}{\beta^2} \boldsymbol{\beta}\times(\boldsymbol{\beta}\times\mathbf{L})$$
or reinstating β = v/c,
$$\mathbf{L}' = \gamma \mathbf{v}\times\mathbf{N} + \mathbf{L} + \frac{\gamma - 1}{v^2} \mathbf{v}\times\left(\mathbf{v}\times\mathbf{L}\right)$$

=== Rigid body rotation ===
For a particle moving in a curve, the cross product of its angular velocity ω (a pseudovector) and position x give its tangential velocity
$$\mathbf{u} = \boldsymbol{\omega} \times \mathbf{x}$$

which cannot exceed a magnitude of c, since in SR the translational velocity of any massive object cannot exceed the speed of light c. Mathematically this constraint is 0 ≤ |u| < c, the vertical bars denote the magnitude of the vector. If the angle between ω and x is θ (assumed to be nonzero, otherwise u would be zero corresponding to no motion at all), then |u| = |ω| |x| sin θ and the angular velocity is restricted by
$$0 \leq |\boldsymbol{\omega}| < \frac{c}{|\mathbf{x}|\sin\theta}$$

The maximum angular velocity of any massive object therefore depends on the size of the object. For a given |x|, the minimum upper limit occurs when ω and x are perpendicular, so that θ = π/2 and sin θ = 1.

For a rotating rigid body rotating with an angular velocity ω, the u is tangential velocity at a point x inside the object. For every point in the object, there is a maximum angular velocity.

The angular velocity (pseudovector) is related to the angular momentum (pseudovector) through the moment of inertia tensor I
$$\mathbf{L} = \mathbf{I}\cdot\boldsymbol{\omega} \quad \rightleftharpoons \quad L_i = I_{ij} \omega_j$$
(the dot · denotes tensor contraction on one index). The relativistic angular momentum is also limited by the size of the object.

== Spin in special relativity ==
=== Four-spin ===
A particle may have a "built-in" angular momentum independent of its motion, called spin and denoted s. It is a 3d pseudovector like orbital angular momentum L.

The spin has a corresponding spin magnetic moment, so if the particle is subject to interactions (like electromagnetic fields or spin-orbit coupling), the direction of the particle's spin vector will change, but its magnitude will be constant.

The extension to special relativity is straightforward. For some lab frame F, let F′ be the rest frame of the particle and suppose the particle moves with constant 3-velocity u. Then F′ is boosted with the same velocity and the Lorentz transformations apply as usual; it is more convenient to use β = u/c. As a four-vector in special relativity, the four-spin S generally takes the usual form of a four-vector with a timelike component s_{t} and spatial components s, in the lab frame
$$\mathbf{S} \equiv \left(S^0, S^1, S^2, S^3\right) = (s_t, s_x, s_y, s_z)$$
although in the rest frame of the particle, it is defined so the timelike component is zero and the spatial components are those of particle's actual spin vector, in the notation here s′, so in the particle's frame
$$\mathbf{S}' \equiv \left({S'}^0, {S'}^1, {S'}^2, {S'}^3\right) = \left(0, s_x', s_y', s_z'\right)$$

Equating norms leads to the invariant relation
$$s_t^2 - \mathbf{s}\cdot\mathbf{s} = -\mathbf{s}'\cdot\mathbf{s}'$$
so if the magnitude of spin is given in the rest frame of the particle and lab frame of an observer, the magnitude of the timelike component s_{t} is given in the lab frame also.

Vector transformations derived from the tensor transformations

The boosted components of the four spin relative to the lab frame are
$$\begin{align}
{S'}^0 &= {\Lambda^0}_\alpha S^\alpha = {\Lambda^0}_0 S^0 + {\Lambda^0}_i S^i = \gamma \left(S^0 - \beta_i S^i\right) \\
&= \gamma \left(\frac{c}{c} S^0 - \frac{u_i}{c} S^i\right) = \frac{1}{c} U_0 S^0 - \frac{1}{c} U_i S^i \\[3pt]
{S'}^i &= {\Lambda^i}_\alpha S^\alpha = {\Lambda^i}_0 S^0 + {\Lambda^i}_j S^j \\
&= -\gamma\beta^i S^0 + \left[\delta_{ij} + \frac{\gamma - 1}{\beta^2} \beta_i\beta_j \right] S^j \\
&= S^i + \frac{\gamma^2}{\gamma + 1}\beta_i \beta_j S^j - \gamma\beta^i S^0
\end{align}$$

Here γ = γ(u). S′ is in the rest frame of the particle, so its timelike component is zero, S′^{0} = 0, not S^{0}. Also, the first is equivalent to the inner product of the four-velocity (divided by c) and the four-spin. Combining these facts leads to
$${S'}^0 = \frac{1}{c} U_\alpha S^\alpha = 0$$
which is an invariant. Then this combined with the transformation on the timelike component leads to the perceived component in the lab frame;
$$S^0 = \beta_i S^i$$

The inverse relations are
$$\begin{align}
S^0 &= \gamma \left({S'}^0 + \beta_i {S'}^i\right) \\
S^i &= {S'}^i + \frac{\gamma^2}{\gamma+1}\beta_i\beta_j {S'}^j + \gamma\beta^i {S'}^0
\end{align}$$

The covariant constraint on the spin is orthogonality to the velocity vector,
$$U_\alpha S^\alpha = 0$$

In 3-vector notation for explicitness, the transformations are
$$\begin{align}
s_t &= \boldsymbol{\beta}\cdot\mathbf{s} \\
\mathbf{s}' &= \mathbf{s} + \frac{\gamma^2}{\gamma + 1}\boldsymbol{\beta} \left(\boldsymbol{\beta}\cdot\mathbf{s}\right) - \gamma\boldsymbol{\beta} s_t
\end{align}$$

The inverse relations
$$\begin{align}
s_t &= \gamma \boldsymbol{\beta}\cdot\mathbf{s}' \\
\mathbf{s} &= \mathbf{s}' + \frac{\gamma^2}{\gamma + 1} \boldsymbol{\beta}\left(\boldsymbol{\beta}\cdot\mathbf{s}'\right)
\end{align}$$
are the components of spin the lab frame, calculated from those in the particle's rest frame. Although the spin of the particle is constant for a given particle, it appears to be different in the lab frame.

=== The Pauli–Lubanski pseudovector ===
The Pauli–Lubanski pseudovector
$$S_\mu = \frac{1}{2}\varepsilon_{\mu\nu\rho\sigma} J^{\nu\rho} P^\sigma ,$$
applies to both massive and massless particles.

== Spin–orbital decomposition ==
In general, the total angular momentum tensor splits into an orbital component and a spin component,
$$J^{\mu\nu} = M^{\mu\nu} + S^{\mu\nu} ~.$$
This applies to a particle, a mass–energy–momentum distribution, or field.

== Angular momentum of a mass–energy–momentum distribution ==
=== Angular momentum from the mass–energy–momentum tensor ===
The following is a summary from MTW. Throughout for simplicity, Cartesian coordinates are assumed. In special and general relativity, a distribution of mass–energy–momentum, e.g. a fluid, or a star, is described by the stress–energy tensor T^{βγ} (a second order tensor field depending on space and time). Since T^{00} is the energy density, T^{j0} for j = 1, 2, 3 is the jth component of the object's 3d momentum per unit volume, and T^{ij} form components of the stress tensor including shear and normal stresses, the orbital angular momentum density about the position 4-vector X̅^{β} is given by a 3rd order tensor
$$\mathcal{M}^{\alpha\beta\gamma} = \left(X^\alpha - \bar{X}^\alpha\right) T^{\beta\gamma} - \left(X^\beta - \bar{X}^\beta\right) T^{\alpha\gamma}$$

This is antisymmetric in α and β. In special and general relativity, T is a symmetric tensor, but in other contexts (e.g., quantum field theory), it may not be.

Let Ω be a region of 4d spacetime. The boundary is a 3d spacetime hypersurface ("spacetime surface volume" as opposed to "spatial surface area"), denoted ∂Ω where "∂" means "boundary". Integrating the angular momentum density over a 3d spacetime hypersurface yields the angular momentum tensor about X̅,
$$M^{\alpha\beta}\left(\bar{X}\right) = \oint_{\partial \Omega} \mathcal{M}^{\alpha\beta\gamma} d \Sigma_\gamma$$
where dΣ_{γ} is the volume 1-form playing the role of a unit vector normal to a 2d surface in ordinary 3d Euclidean space. The integral is taken over the coordinates X, not X̅ (i.e. Y). The integral within a spacelike surface of constant time is
$$M^{ij} = \oint_{\partial \Omega} \mathcal{M}^{ij0} d \Sigma_0 = \oint_{\partial \Omega} \left[\left(X^i - Y^i\right)T^{j0} - \left(X^j - Y^j\right) T^{i0}\right] dx \, dy \, dz$$
which collectively form the angular momentum tensor.

=== Angular momentum about the centre of mass ===
There is an intrinsic angular momentum in the centre-of-mass frame, in other words, the angular momentum about any event
$$\mathbf{X}_\text{COM} = \left(X^0_\text{COM}, X^1_\text{COM}, X^2_\text{COM}, X^3_\text{COM}\right)$$
on the wordline of the object's center of mass. Since T^{00} is the energy density of the object, the spatial coordinates of the center of mass are given by
$$X^i_\text{COM} = \frac{1}{m_0} \int_{\partial \Omega} X^i T^{00} dxdydz$$

Setting Y = X_{COM} obtains the orbital angular momentum density about the centre-of-mass of the object.

=== Angular momentum conservation ===
The conservation of energy–momentum is given in differential form by the continuity equation
$$\partial_\gamma T^{\beta\gamma} = 0$$
where ∂_{γ} is the four-gradient. (In non-Cartesian coordinates and general relativity this would be replaced by the covariant derivative). The total angular momentum conservation is given by another continuity equation
$$\partial_\gamma \mathcal{J}^{\alpha\beta\gamma} = 0$$

The integral equations use Gauss' theorem in spacetime
$$\begin{align}
\int_\mathcal{V} \partial_\gamma T^{\beta\gamma} \, c dt \, dx \, dy \, dz &= \oint_{\partial \mathcal{V}} T^{\beta\gamma} d^3 \Sigma_\gamma = 0 \\
\int_\mathcal{V} \partial_\gamma \mathcal{J}^{\alpha\beta\gamma} \, c dt \, dx \, dy \, dz &= \oint_{\partial \mathcal{V}} \mathcal{J}^{\alpha\beta\gamma} d^3 \Sigma_\gamma = 0
\end{align}$$

== Torque in special relativity ==
The torque acting on a point-like particle is defined as the derivative of the angular momentum tensor given above with respect to proper time:
$$\boldsymbol{\Gamma} = \frac{d \mathbf{M}}{d\tau} = \mathbf{X}\wedge \mathbf{F}$$
or in tensor components:
$$\Gamma_{\alpha\beta} = X_\alpha F_\beta - X_\beta F_\alpha$$
where F is the 4d force acting on the particle at the event X. As with angular momentum, torque is additive, so for an extended object one sums or integrates over the distribution of mass.

== Angular momentum as the generator of spacetime boosts and rotations ==
The angular momentum tensor is the generator of boosts and rotations for the Lorentz group. Lorentz boosts can be parametrized by rapidity, and a 3d unit vector n pointing in the direction of the boost, which combine into the "rapidity vector"
$$\boldsymbol{\zeta} = \zeta\mathbf{n} = \mathbf{n}\tanh^{-1}\beta$$
where β = v/c is the speed of the relative motion divided by the speed of light. Spatial rotations can be parametrized by the axis–angle representation, the angle θ and a unit vector a pointing in the direction of the axis, which combine into an "axis-angle vector"
$$\boldsymbol{\theta} = \theta\mathbf{a}$$

Each unit vector only has two independent components, the third is determined from the unit magnitude. Altogether there are six parameters of the Lorentz group; three for rotations and three for boosts. The (homogeneous) Lorentz group is 6-dimensional.

The boost generators K and rotation generators J can be combined into one generator for Lorentz transformations; M the antisymmetric angular momentum tensor, with components
$$M^{0i} = -M^{i0} = K_i \,,\quad M^{ij} = \varepsilon_{ijk} J_k \,.$$
and correspondingly, the boost and rotation parameters are collected into another antisymmetric four-dimensional matrix ω, with entries:
$$\omega_{0i} = - \omega_{i0} = \zeta_i \,,\quad \omega_{ij} = \varepsilon_{ijk} \theta_k \,,$$
where the summation convention over the repeated indices i, j, k has been used to prevent clumsy summation signs. The general Lorentz transformation is then given by the matrix exponential
$$\Lambda(\boldsymbol{\zeta},\boldsymbol{\theta}) = \exp\left(\frac{1}{2}\omega_{\alpha\beta}M^{\alpha\beta}\right) = \exp \left(\boldsymbol{\zeta} \cdot \mathbf{K} + \boldsymbol{\theta}\cdot\mathbf{J}\right)$$
and the summation convention has been applied to the repeated matrix indices α and β.

The general Lorentz transformation Λ is the transformation law for any four vector A = (A_{0}, A_{1}, A_{2}, A_{3}), giving the components of this same 4-vector in another inertial frame of reference
$$\mathbf{A}' = \Lambda(\boldsymbol{\zeta},\boldsymbol{\theta}) \mathbf{A}$$

The angular momentum tensor forms 6 of the 10 generators of the Poincaré group, the other four are the components of the four-momentum for spacetime translations.

== Angular momentum in general relativity ==
The angular momentum of test particles in a gently curved background is more complicated in GR but can be generalized in a straightforward manner. If the Lagrangian is expressed with respect to angular variables as the generalized coordinates, then the angular momenta are the functional derivatives of the Lagrangian with respect to the angular velocities. Referred to Cartesian coordinates, these are typically given by the off-diagonal shear terms of the spacelike part of the stress–energy tensor. If the spacetime supports a Killing vector field tangent to a circle, then the angular momentum about the axis is conserved.

One also wishes to study the effect of a compact, rotating mass on its surrounding spacetime. The prototype solution is of the Kerr metric, which describes the spacetime around an axially symmetric black hole. It is obviously impossible to draw a point on the event horizon of a Kerr black hole and watch it circle around. However, the solution does support a constant of the system that acts mathematically similarly to an angular momentum.

In general relativity where gravitational waves exist, the asymptotic symmetry group in asymptotically flat spacetimes is not the expected ten-dimensional Poincaré group of special relativity, but the infinite-dimensional group formulated in 1962 by Bondi, van der Burg, Metzner, and Sachs, the so-called BMS group, which contains an infinite superset of the four spacetime translations, named supertranslations. Despite half a century of research, difficulties with "supertranslation ambiguity" persisted in fundamental notions like the angular momentum carried away by gravitational waves. In 2020, novel supertranslation-invariant definitions of angular momentum began to be formulated by different researchers. Supertranslation invariance of angular momentum and other Lorentz charges in general relativity continues to be an active area of research.

== See also ==
- Thomas precession – Relativistic correction
- Angular momentum of light – Physical quantity carried in photons
- Two-body problem in general relativity
- Relativistic mechanics – Theory of motion and forces for objects close to the speed of light
- Mathisson–Papapetrou–Dixon equations – General relativity equation
