= Continuous spin particle =

Theoretical massless elementary particle

In theoretical physics, a continuous spin particle (CSP), sometimes called an infinite spin particle, is a massless particle never observed before in nature. This particle is one of Poincaré group's massless representations which, along with ordinary massless particles, was classified by Eugene Wigner in 1939. Historically, a compatible theory that could describe this elementary particle was unknown; however, 75 years after Wigner's classification, the first local action principle for bosonic continuous spin particles was introduced in 2014, and the first local action principle for fermionic continuous spin particles was suggested in 2015. It has been illustrated that this particle can interact with matter in flat spacetime. Supersymmetric continuous spin gauge theory has been studied in three and four spacetime dimensions.

In condensed matter systems, CSPs can be understood as massless generalizations of the anyon.
