= Representation rigid group =

In mathematics, in the representation theory of groups, a group is said to be representation rigid if for every $n$, it has only finitely many isomorphism classes of complex irreducible representations of dimension $n$.
