= Pauli–Lubanski pseudovector =

Operator in quantum field theory

In physics, the Pauli–Lubański pseudovector is an operator defined from the momentum and angular momentum, used in the quantum-relativistic description of angular momentum. It is named after Wolfgang Pauli and Józef Lubański.

It describes the spin states of moving particles. It is the generator of the little group of the Poincaré group, that is the maximal subgroup (with four generators) leaving the eigenvalues of the four-momentum vector P_{μ} invariant.

== Definition ==
It is usually denoted by W (or less often by S) and defined by:

$W_\mu \mathrel\stackrel{\text{def}}{=} \tfrac{1}{2}\varepsilon_{\mu \nu \rho \sigma} J^{\nu \rho} P^\sigma ,$

where

- $\varepsilon_{\mu \nu \rho \sigma}$ is the four-dimensional totally antisymmetric Levi-Civita symbol;
- $J^{\nu \rho}$ is the relativistic angular momentum tensor operator ($M^{\nu \rho}$);
- $P^{\sigma}$ is the four-momentum operator.

In the language of exterior algebra, it can be written as the Hodge dual of a trivector,

$$\mathbf{W} = \star(\mathbf{J} \wedge \mathbf{p}).$$

Note $W_0 = \vec{J} \cdot \vec{P}$, and $\vec{W} = E \vec{J}- \vec{P} \times \vec{K}$ where $\vec{J}$ is the generator of rotations and $\vec{K}$ is the generator of boosts.

W_{μ} evidently satisfies
$$P^{\mu}W_{\mu}=0,$$

as well as the following commutator relations,
$$\begin{align}
\left[P^\mu, W^\nu\right] &= 0, \\
\left[J^{\mu \nu}, W^\rho\right] &= i \left( g^{\rho \nu} W^\mu - g^{\rho \mu} W^\nu\right),
\end{align}$$

Consequently,
$$\left[W_{\mu}, W_{\nu}\right] = -i \epsilon_{\mu \nu \rho \sigma} W^{\rho} P^{\sigma}.$$

The scalar W_{μ}W^{μ} is a Lorentz-invariant operator, and commutes with the four-momentum, and can thus serve as a label for irreducible unitary representations of the Poincaré group. That is, it can serve as the label for the spin, a feature of the spacetime structure of the representation, over and above the relativistically invariant label P_{μ}P^{μ} for the mass of all states in a representation.

== Little group ==
On an eigenspace $S$ of the 4-momentum operator $P$ with 4-momentum eigenvalue $k$ of the Hilbert space of a quantum system (or for that matter the standard representation with $\mathbb{R}^4$ interpreted as momentum space acted on by 5×5 matrices with the upper left 4×4 block an ordinary Lorentz transformation, the last column reserved for translations and the action effected on elements $p$ (column vectors) of momentum space with 1 appended as a fifth row, see standard texts) the following holds:

- The components of $W$ with $P^\mu$ replaced by $k^\mu$ form a Lie algebra. It is the Lie algebra of the Little group $L_k$of $k$, i.e. the subgroup of the homogeneous Lorentz group that leaves $k$ invariant.
- For every irreducible unitary representation of $L_k$ there is an irreducible unitary representation of the full Poincaré group called an induced representation.
- A representation space of the induced representation can be obtained by successive application of elements of the full Poincaré group to a non-zero element of $S$ and extending by linearity.

The irreducible unitary representation of the Poincaré group are characterized by the eigenvalues of the two Casimir operators $P^2$ and $W^2$. The best way to see that an irreducible unitary representation actually is obtained is to exhibit its action on an element with arbitrary 4-momentum eigenvalue $p$ in the representation space thus obtained. Irreducibility follows from the construction of the representation space.

== Massive fields ==
In quantum field theory, in the case of a massive field, the Casimir invariant W_{μ}W^{μ} describes the total spin of the particle, with eigenvalues
$$W^2 = W_\mu W^\mu = -m^2 s(s + 1),$$
where s is the spin quantum number of the particle and m is its rest mass.

It is straightforward to see this in the rest frame of the particle, the above commutator acting on the particle's state amounts to [W_{j} , W_{k}] = i ε_{jkl} W_{l} m; hence W→ = mJ→ and W^{0} = 0, so that the little group amounts to the rotation group,
$$W_\mu W^\mu = -m^2 \vec{J}\cdot\vec{J}.$$
Since this is a Lorentz invariant quantity, it will be the same in all other reference frames.

It is also customary to take W^{3} to describe the spin projection along the third direction in the rest frame.

In moving frames, decomposing W = (W_{0}, W→) into components (W_{1}, W_{2}, W_{3}), with W_{1} and W_{2} orthogonal to P→, and W_{3} parallel to P→, the Pauli–Lubanski vector may be expressed in terms of the spin vector S→ = (S_{1}, S_{2}, S_{3}) (similarly decomposed) as
$$\begin{align}
W_0 &= \frac{P}{c} S_3, &
W_1 &= m S_1, &
W_2 &= m S_2, &
W_3 &= \frac{E}{c^2} S_3,
\end{align}$$

where
$$E^2 = P^2 c^2 + m^2 c^4$$
is the energy–momentum relation.

The transverse components W_{1}, W_{2}, along with S_{3}, satisfy the following commutator relations (which apply generally, not just to non-zero mass representations),
$$\begin{align}[]
[W_1, W_2] &= \frac{ih}{2\pi} \left(\left(\frac{E}{c^2}\right)^2 - \left(\frac{P}{c}\right)^2\right) S_3, &
[W_2, S_3] &= \frac{ih}{2\pi} W_1, &
[S_3, W_1] &= \frac{ih}{2\pi} W_2.
\end{align}$$

For particles with non-zero mass, and the fields associated with such particles,
$$[W_1, W_2] = \frac{ih}{2\pi} m^2 S_3.$$

== Massless fields ==
In general, in the case of non-massive representations, two cases may be distinguished. For massless particles,
$$W^2 = W_\mu W^\mu = -E^{2}\left((K_2 - J_1)^2 + (K_1 + J_2)^2\right) \mathrel\stackrel{\mathrm{def}}{=} -E^2\left(A^2 + B^2\right) ,$$
where K→ is the dynamic mass moment vector. So, mathematically, P^{2} = 0 does not imply W^{2} = 0.

=== Continuous spin representations ===
In the more general case, the components of W→ transverse to P→ may be non-zero, thus yielding the family of representations referred to as the cylindrical luxons ("luxon" is another term for "massless particle"), their identifying property being that the components of W→ form a Lie subalgebra isomorphic to the 2-dimensional Euclidean group ISO(2), with the longitudinal component of W→ playing the role of the rotation generator, and the transverse components the role of translation generators. This amounts to a group contraction of SO(3), and leads to what are known as the continuous spin representations. However, there are no known physical cases of fundamental particles or fields in this family. It can be argued that continuous spin states possess an internal degree of freedom not seen in observed massless particles.

=== Helicity representations ===
In a special case, $\vec{W}$ is parallel to $\vec{P} ;$ or equivalently $\vec{W} \times \vec{P} = \vec{\boldsymbol{0}} .$ For non-zero $\vec{W}$ this constraint can only be consistently imposed for luxons (massless particles), since the commutator of the two transverse components of $\vec{W}$ is proportional to $m^2 \vec{J} \cdot \vec{P} \, .$ For this family, $W^2 = 0$ and $W^\mu = \lambda \, P^\mu$ the invariant is, instead given by
$$\left(W^0\right)^2 = \left(W^3\right)^2 ,$$
where
$$W^0 = -\vec{J} \cdot \vec{P} ,$$
so the invariant is represented by the helicity operator
$$W^0 / P .$$

All particles that interact with the weak nuclear force, for instance, fall into this family, since the definition of weak nuclear charge (weak isospin) involves helicity, which, by above, must be an invariant. The appearance of non-zero mass in such cases must then be explained by other means, such as the Higgs mechanism. Even after accounting for such mass-generating mechanisms, however, the photon (and therefore the electromagnetic field) continues to fall into this class, although the other mass eigenstates of the carriers of the electroweak force (the W^{±} boson and anti-boson and Z^{0} boson) acquire non-zero mass.

Neutrinos were formerly considered to fall into this class as well. However, because neutrinos have been observed to oscillate in flavour, it is now known that at least two of the three mass eigenstates of the left-helicity neutrinos and right-helicity anti-neutrinos each must have non-zero mass.

== See also ==
- Wigner's classification – Classification of irreducible representations of the Poincaré group
- Angular momentum operator – Quantum mechanical operator related to rotational symmetry
- Casimir operator – Distinguished element of a Lie algebra's center
- Chirality – Property of particles related to spin
- Pseudovector – Physical quantity that changes sign with improper rotation
- Pseudotensor – Type of physical quantity
- Induced representation – Process of extending a representation of a subgroup to the parent group
