= Helicity (particle physics) =

Projection of spin along the direction of momentum

In physics, helicity is the projection of the spin onto the direction of momentum.

Mathematically, helicity is the sign of the projection of the spin vector onto the momentum vector: "left" is negative, "right" is positive. Thus, it can be represented with the operator $\frac{\hat \mathbf{p} \cdot \hat \mathbf{\Sigma}}{|\hat \mathbf{p}|}$, where $\hat \mathbf{p}$ is the momentum operator and $\hat \mathbf{\Sigma}$ is the spin operator.

== Overview ==
The angular momentum J is the sum of an orbital angular momentum L and a spin S. The relationship between orbital angular momentum L, the position operator r and the linear momentum (orbit part) p is

$$\mathbf{L} = \mathbf{r}\times\mathbf{p} ,$$

so L's component in the direction of p is zero. Thus, helicity is just the projection of the spin onto the direction of linear momentum. The helicity of a particle is positive ("right-handed") if the direction of its spin is the same as the direction of its motion and negative ("left-handed") if opposite.

Helicity is conserved. That is, the helicity commutes with the Hamiltonian, and thus, in the absence of external forces, is time-invariant. It is also rotationally invariant, in that a rotation applied to the system leaves the helicity unchanged. Helicity, however, is not Lorentz invariant; under the action of a Lorentz boost, the helicity may change sign. Consider, for example, a baseball, pitched as a gyroball, so that its spin axis is aligned with the direction of the pitch. It will have one helicity with respect to the point of view of the players on the field, but would appear to have a flipped helicity in any frame moving faster than the ball.

=== Comparison with chirality ===
In this sense, helicity can be contrasted to chirality, which is Lorentz invariant, but is not a constant of motion for massive particles. For massless particles, the two coincide: The helicity is equal to the chirality, both are Lorentz invariant, and both are constants of motion.

In quantum mechanics, angular momentum is quantized, and thus helicity is quantized as well. Because the eigenvalues of spin with respect to an axis have discrete values, the eigenvalues of helicity are also discrete. For a massive particle of spin S, the eigenvalues of helicity are S, S − 1, S − 2, ..., −S. For massless particles, not all of spin eigenvalues correspond to physically meaningful degrees of freedom: For example, the photon is a massless spin 1 particle with helicity eigenvalues −1 and +1, but the eigenvalue 0 is not physically present.

All known spin-$\tfrac{1}{2}$ particles have non-zero mass; however, for hypothetical massless spin-1/2 particles (the Weyl spinors), helicity is equivalent to the chirality operator multiplied by $\ \tfrac{1}{2}\hbar ~.$ By contrast, for massive particles, distinct chirality states (e.g., as occur in the weak interaction charges) have both positive and negative helicity components, in ratios proportional to the mass of the particle.

A treatment of the helicity of gravitational waves can be found in Weinberg. In summary, they come in only two forms: +2 and −2, while the +1, 0 and −1 helicities are "non-dynamical" (they can be removed by a gauge transformation).

== Little group ==
In 3 + 1 dimensions, the little group for a massless particle is the double cover of SE(2). This has unitary representations which are invariant under the SE(2) "translations" and transform as e^{ihθ} under a SE(2) rotation by θ. This is the helicity h representation. There is also another unitary representation which transforms non-trivially under the SE(2) translations. This is the continuous spin representation.

In d + 1 dimensions, the little group is the double cover of SE(d − 1) (the case where d ≤ 2 is more complicated because of anyons, etc.). As before, there are unitary representations which don't transform under the SE(d − 1) "translations" (the "standard" representations) and "continuous spin" representations.

== See also ==
- Chirality (physics)
- Helicity basis
- Gyroball, a macroscopic object (specifically a baseball) exhibiting an analogous phenomenon
- Wigner's classification
- Pauli–Lubanski pseudovector

== Other sources ==
- Povh, Bogdan; Lavelle, Martin; Rith, Klaus; Scholz, Christoph; Zetsche, Frank (2008). Particles and Nuclei: An introduction to the physical concepts (6th ed.). Berlin, DE: Springer. ISBN 9783540793687.
- Schwartz, Matthew D. (2014). "Chirality, helicity, and spin". Quantum Field Theory and the Standard Model. Cambridge, UK: Cambridge University Press. pp. 185–187. ISBN 9781107034730.
- Taylor, John (1992). "Gauge theories in particle physics". In Davies, Paul (ed.). The New Physics (1st pbk. ed.). Cambridge, UK: Cambridge University Press. pp. 458–480. ISBN 9780521438315.
