= Isospin multiplet =

In particle physics, isospin multiplets are families of hadrons with approximately equal masses. All particles within a multiplet have the same spin, parity, and baryon numbers, but differ in electric charges.

Isospin formally behaves as an angular momentum operator and thus satisfies the appropriate canonical commutation relations. For a given isospin quantum number I, 2I + 1 states are allowed, as if they were the third components of an angular momentum operator Î. The set of these states is called isospin multiplet and is used to accommodate the particles.

An example of an isospin multiplet is the nucleon multiplet consisting of the proton and the neutron. In this case I = 1/2 and by convention the proton corresponds to the I_{3} = +1/2, while the neutron to I_{3} = -1/2. Another example is given by the delta baryons. In this case I = 3/2.

The existence of the multiplets with approximately equal masses owes to the fact that the masses of up and down quarks are approximately equal (compared to a typical hadron mass), and the strong interaction is quark flavour blind. This makes the isospin symmetry a good approximation.
