= Poincaré group =

Group of flat spacetime symmetries

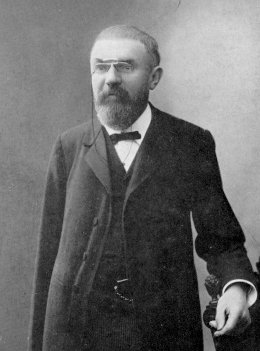
Henri Poincaré

The Poincaré group, named after Henri Poincaré (1905), was first defined by Hermann Minkowski (1908) as the isometry group of Minkowski spacetime. It is a ten-dimensional non-abelian Lie group that is of importance as a model in our understanding of the most basic fundamentals of physics.

== Overview ==
The Poincaré group consists of all coordinate transformations of Minkowski space that do not change the spacetime interval between events. For example, if everything were postponed by two hours, including the two events and the path you took to go from one to the other, then the time interval between the events recorded by a stopwatch that you carried with you would be the same. Or if everything were shifted five kilometres to the west, or turned 60 degrees to the right, you would also see no change in the interval. It turns out that the proper length of an object is also unaffected by such a shift.

In total, there are ten degrees of freedom for such transformations. They may be thought of as translation through time or space (four degrees, one per dimension); reflection through a plane (three degrees, the freedom in orientation of this plane); or a "boost" in any of the three spatial directions (three degrees). Composition of transformations is the operation of the Poincaré group, with rotations being produced as the composition of an even number of reflections.

In classical physics, the Galilean group is a comparable ten-parameter group that acts on absolute time and space. Instead of boosts, it features shear mappings to relate co-moving frames of reference.

In general relativity, i.e. under the effects of gravity, Poincaré symmetry applies only locally. A treatment of symmetries in general relativity is not in the scope of this article.

== Poincaré symmetry ==
Poincaré symmetry is the full symmetry of special relativity. It includes:

- translations (displacements) in time and space, forming the abelian Lie group of spacetime translations (P);
- rotations in space, forming the non-abelian Lie group of three-dimensional rotations (J);
- boosts, transformations connecting two uniformly moving bodies (K).

The last two symmetries, J and K, together make the Lorentz group (see also Lorentz invariance); the semi-direct product of the spacetime translations group and the Lorentz group then produce the Poincaré group. Objects that are invariant under this group are then said to possess Poincaré invariance or relativistic invariance.

10 generators (in four spacetime dimensions) associated with the Poincaré symmetry, by Noether's theorem, imply 10 conservation laws:

- 1 for the energy – associated with translations through time
- 3 for the momentum – associated with translations through spatial dimensions
- 3 for the angular momentum – associated with rotations between spatial dimensions
- 3 for a quantity involving the velocity of the center of mass – associated with hyperbolic rotations between each spatial dimension and time

== Poincaré group ==
The Poincaré group is the group of Minkowski spacetime isometries. It is a ten-dimensional noncompact Lie group. The four-dimensional abelian group of spacetime translations is a normal subgroup, while the six-dimensional Lorentz group is also a subgroup, the stabilizer of the origin. The Poincaré group itself is the minimal subgroup of the affine group which includes all translations and Lorentz transformations. More precisely, it is a semidirect product of the spacetime translations group and the Lorentz group,

$$\mathbf{R}^{1,3} \rtimes \operatorname{O}(1, 3) \,,$$

with group multiplication

$(\alpha, f) \cdot (\beta, g) = (\alpha + f \cdot \beta,\; f \cdot g)$.

Another way of putting this is that the Poincaré group is a group extension of the Lorentz group by a vector representation of it; it is sometimes dubbed, informally, as the inhomogeneous Lorentz group. In turn, it can also be obtained as a group contraction of the de Sitter group SO(4, 1) ~ Sp(2, 2), as the de Sitter radius goes to infinity.

Its positive energy unitary irreducible representations are indexed by mass (nonnegative number) and spin (integer or half integer) and are associated with particles in quantum mechanics (see Wigner's classification).

In accordance with the Erlangen program, the geometry of Minkowski space is defined by the Poincaré group: Minkowski space is considered as a homogeneous space for the group.

In quantum field theory, the universal cover of the Poincaré group

$$\mathbf{R}^{1,3} \rtimes \operatorname{SL}(2, \mathbf{C}),$$

which may be identified with the double cover

$$\mathbf{R}^{1,3} \rtimes \operatorname{Spin}(1, 3),$$

is more important, because representations of $\operatorname{SO}(1, 3)$ are not able to describe fields with spin 1/2; i.e. fermions. Here $\operatorname{SL}(2,\mathbf{C})$ is the group of complex $2 \times 2$ matrices with unit determinant, isomorphic to the Lorentz-signature spin group $\operatorname{Spin}(1, 3)$.

== Poincaré algebra ==
The Poincaré algebra is the Lie algebra of the Poincaré group. It is a Lie algebra extension of the Lie algebra of the Lorentz group. More specifically, the proper ($\det\Lambda = 1$), orthochronous (${\Lambda^0}_0 \geq 1$) part of the Lorentz subgroup (its identity component), $\mathrm{SO}(1, 3)_+^\uparrow$, is connected to the identity and is thus provided by the exponentiation $\exp\left(ia_\mu P^\mu\right)\exp\left(\frac{i}{2}\omega_{\mu\nu} M^{\mu\nu}\right)$ of this Lie algebra. In component form, the Poincaré algebra is given by the commutation relations:

$$\begin{align}[]
[P_\mu, P_\nu] &= 0\, \\
\frac{1}{i}~[M_{\mu\nu}, P_\rho] &= \eta_{\mu\rho} P_\nu - \eta_{\nu\rho} P_\mu\, \\
\frac{1}{i}~[M_{\mu\nu}, M_{\rho\sigma}] &= \eta_{\mu\rho} M_{\nu\sigma} - \eta_{\mu\sigma} M_{\nu\rho} - \eta_{\nu\rho} M_{\mu\sigma} + \eta_{\nu\sigma} M_{\mu\rho}\, ,
\end{align}$$

where $P$ is the generator of translations, $M$ is the generator of Lorentz transformations, and $\eta$ is the $(+,-,-,-)$ Minkowski metric (see Sign convention).

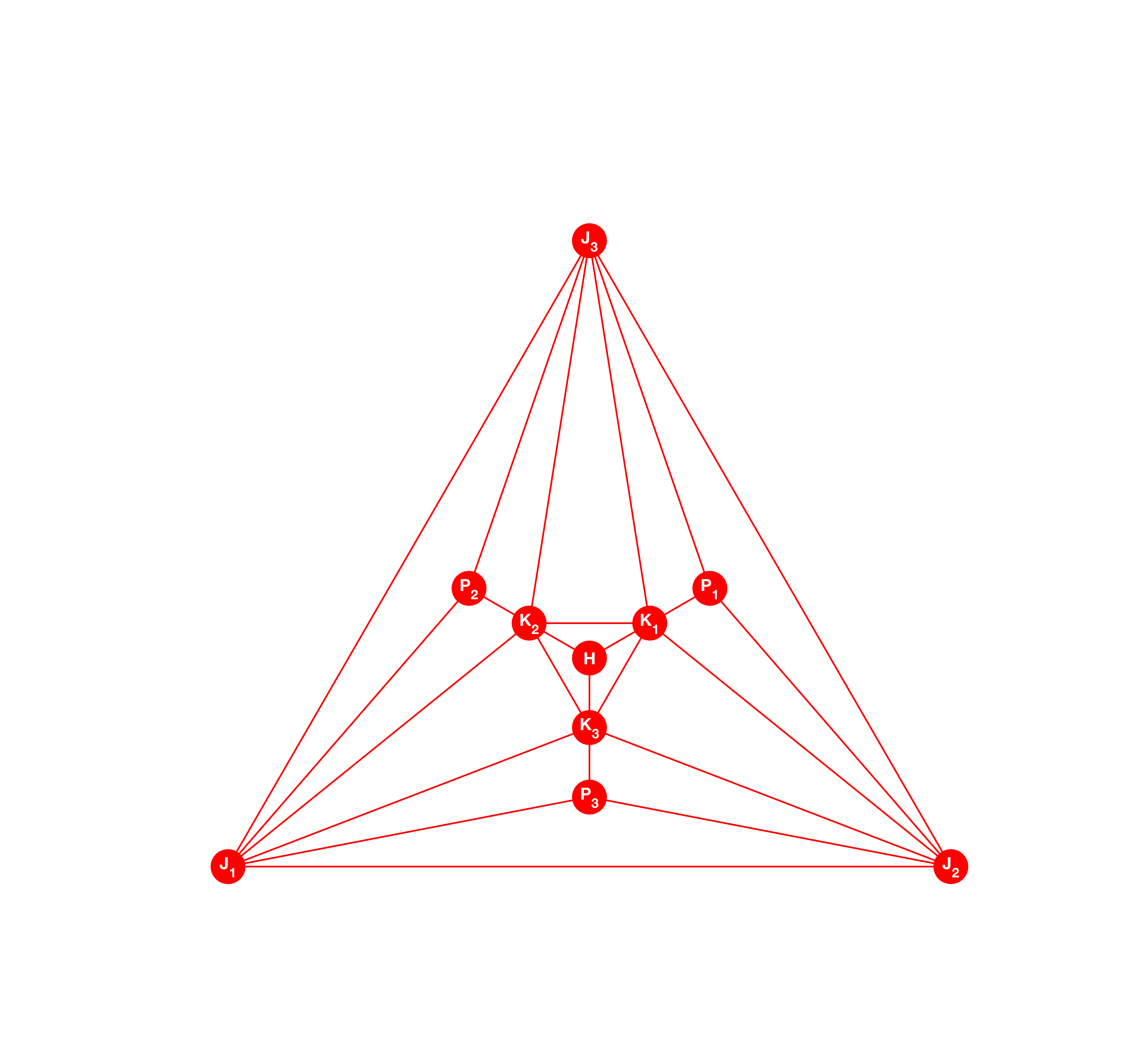
A diagram of the commutation structure of the Poincaré algebra. The edges of the diagram connect generators with nonzero commutators.

The bottom commutation relation is the ("homogeneous") Lorentz group, consisting of rotations, $J_i = \frac{1}{2}\epsilon_{imn} M^{mn}$, and boosts, $K_i = M_{i0}$. In this notation, the entire Poincaré algebra is expressible in noncovariant (but more practical) language as

$$\begin{align}[]
[J_m, P_n] &=  i \epsilon_{mnk} P_k ~, \\[]
[J_i, P_0] &=  0 ~, \\[]
[K_i, P_k] &=  i \eta_{ik} P_0 ~, \\[]
[K_i, P_0] &= -i P_i ~, \\[]
[J_m, J_n] &=  i \epsilon_{mnk} J_k ~, \\[]
[J_m, K_n] &=  i \epsilon_{mnk} K_k ~, \\[]
[K_m, K_n] &= -i \epsilon_{mnk} J_k ~,
\end{align}$$

where the bottom line commutator of two boosts is often referred to as a "Wigner rotation". The simplification $[J_m + iK_m,\, J_n -iK_n] = 0$ permits reduction of the Lorentz subalgebra to $\mathfrak{su}(2) \oplus \mathfrak{su}(2)$ and efficient treatment of its associated representations. In terms of the physical parameters, we have

$$\begin{align}
\left[\mathcal H, p_i\right] &=  0 \\
\left[\mathcal H, L_i\right] &=  0 \\
\left[\mathcal H, K_i\right] &=  i\hbar cp_i \\
\left[p_i, p_j\right] &=  0 \\
\left[p_i, L_j\right] &=  i\hbar\epsilon_{ijk}p_k \\
\left[p_i, K_j\right] &=  \frac{i\hbar}c\mathcal H\delta_{ij} \\
\left[L_i, L_j\right] &=  i\hbar\epsilon_{ijk}L_k \\
\left[L_i, K_j\right] &=  i\hbar\epsilon_{ijk}K_k \\
\left[K_i, K_j\right] &= -i\hbar\epsilon_{ijk}L_k
\end{align}$$

The Casimir invariants of this algebra are $P_\mu P^\mu$ and $W_\mu W^\mu$ where $W_\mu$ is the Pauli–Lubanski pseudovector; they serve as labels for the representations of the group.

The Poincaré group is the full symmetry group of any relativistic field theory. As a result, all elementary particles fall in representations of this group. These are usually specified by the four-momentum squared of each particle (i.e. its mass squared) and the intrinsic quantum numbers $J^{PC}$, where $J$ is the spin quantum number, $P$ is the parity and $C$ is the charge-conjugation quantum number. In practice, charge conjugation and parity are violated by many quantum field theories; where this occurs, $P$ and $C$ are forfeited. Since CPT symmetry is invariant in quantum field theory, a time-reversal quantum number may be constructed from those given.

As a topological space, the group has four connected components: the component of the identity; the time reversed component; the spatial inversion component; and the component which is both time-reversed and spatially inverted.

== Other dimensions ==
The definitions above can be generalized to arbitrary dimensions in a straightforward manner. The d-dimensional Poincaré group is analogously defined by the semi-direct product

$$\operatorname{IO}(1, d - 1) := \mathbf{R}^{1, d-1} \rtimes \operatorname{O}(1, d - 1)$$

with the analogous multiplication

$(\alpha, f) \cdot (\beta, g) = (\alpha + f \cdot \beta,\; f \cdot g)$.

The Lie algebra retains its form, with indices µ and ν now taking values between 0 and d − 1. The alternative representation in terms of J_{i} and K_{i} has no analogue in higher dimensions.

== See also ==
- Continuous spin particle
- Euclidean group
- Galilean group
- Particle physics and representation theory
- Pauli–Lubanski pseudovector
- Representation theory of the Poincaré group
- Super-Poincaré algebra
- Symmetry in quantum mechanics
- Wigner's classification
