= Casimir element =

Distinguished element of a Lie algebra's center

In mathematics, a Casimir element (also known as a Casimir invariant or Casimir operator) is a distinguished element of the center of the universal enveloping algebra of a Lie algebra. A prototypical example is the squared angular momentum operator, which is a Casimir element of the three-dimensional rotation group.

More generally, Casimir elements can be used to refer to any element of the center of the universal enveloping algebra. The algebra of these elements is known to be isomorphic to a polynomial algebra through the Harish-Chandra isomorphism.

The Casimir element is named after Hendrik Casimir, who identified them in his description of rigid body dynamics in 1931.

== Definition ==
The most commonly used Casimir invariant is the quadratic invariant. It is the simplest to define, and so is given first. However, one may also have Casimir invariants of higher order, which correspond to homogeneous symmetric polynomials of higher order.

=== Quadratic Casimir element ===
Suppose that $\mathfrak{g}$ is an $n$-dimensional Lie algebra. Let B be a nondegenerate bilinear form on $\mathfrak{g}$ that is invariant under the adjoint action of $\mathfrak{g}$ on itself, meaning that $B(\operatorname{ad}_XY, Z) + B(Y, \operatorname{ad}_X Z) = 0$ for all X, Y, Z in $\mathfrak{g}$. (The most typical choice of B is the Killing form if $\mathfrak{g}$ is semisimple.) Let

$$\{X_i\}_{i=1}^n$$

be any basis of $\mathfrak{g}$, and

$$\{X^i\}_{i=1}^n$$

be the dual basis of $\mathfrak{g}$ with respect to B. The Casimir element $\Omega$ for B is the element of the universal enveloping algebra $U(\mathfrak{g})$ given by the formula

$$\Omega = \sum_{i=1}^n X_i X^i.$$

Although the definition relies on a choice of basis for the Lie algebra, it is easy to show that Ω is independent of this choice. On the other hand, Ω does depend on the bilinear form B. The invariance of B implies that the Casimir element commutes with all elements of the Lie algebra $\mathfrak{g}$, and hence lies in the center of the universal enveloping algebra $U(\mathfrak{g})$.

=== Quadratic Casimir invariant of a linear representation and of a smooth action ===
Given a representation ρ of $\mathfrak{g}$ on a vector space V, possibly infinite-dimensional, the Casimir invariant of ρ is defined to be ρ(Ω), the linear operator on V given by the formula

$$\rho(\Omega) = \sum_{i=1}^n \rho(X_i)\rho(X^i).$$

A specific form of this construction plays an important role in differential geometry and global analysis. Suppose that a connected Lie group G with Lie algebra $\mathfrak{g}$ acts on a differentiable manifold M. Consider the corresponding representation ρ of G on the space of smooth functions on M. Then elements of $\mathfrak{g}$ are represented by first order differential operators on M. In this situation, the Casimir invariant of ρ is the G-invariant second order differential operator on M defined by the above formula.

Specializing further, if it happens that M has a Riemannian metric on which G acts transitively by isometries, and the stabilizer subgroup G_{x} of a point acts irreducibly on the tangent space of M at x, then the Casimir invariant of ρ is a scalar multiple of the Laplacian operator coming from the metric.

More general Casimir invariants may also be defined, commonly occurring in the study of pseudo-differential operators in Fredholm theory.

=== Casimir elements of higher order ===
The article on universal enveloping algebras gives a detailed, precise definition of Casimir operators, and an exposition of some of their properties. All Casimir operators correspond to symmetric homogeneous polynomials in the symmetric algebra of the adjoint representation $\operatorname{ad}_\mathfrak{g}.$:

$$C_{(m)} = \kappa^{ij\cdots k} X_i \otimes X_j \otimes \cdots\otimes X_k$$

where m is the order of the symmetric tensor $\kappa^{ij\cdots k}$ and the $X_i$ form a vector space basis of $\mathfrak{g}.$ This corresponds to a symmetric homogeneous polynomial

$$c_{(m)} = \kappa^{ij\cdots k} t_i t_j \cdots t_k$$

in m indeterminate variables $t_i$ in the polynomial algebra $K[t_i, t_j, \cdots ,t_k]$ over a field K. The reason for the symmetry follows from the PBW theorem and is discussed in much greater detail in the article on universal enveloping algebras.

Moreover, a Casimir element must belong to the center of the universal enveloping algebra, i.e. it must obey

$$[C_{(m)}, X_i] = 0$$

for all basis elements $X_i.$ In terms of the corresponding symmetric tensor $\kappa^{ij\cdots k}$, this condition is equivalent to the tensor being invariant:

$$f_{ij}^{\;\; k}  \kappa^{jl\cdots m}
+ f_{ij}^{\;\; l}  \kappa^{kj\cdots m} + \cdots
+ f_{ij}^{\;\; m}  \kappa^{kl\cdots j} = 0$$

where $f_{ij}^{\;\; k}$ are the structure constants of the Lie algebra i.e. $[X_i,X_j]=f_{ij}^{\;\; k}X_k$.

== Properties ==
=== Uniqueness of the quadratic Casimir element ===
Since for a simple Lie algebra every invariant bilinear form is a multiple of the Killing form, the corresponding Casimir element is uniquely defined up to a constant. For a general semisimple Lie algebra, the space of invariant bilinear forms has one basis vector for each simple component, and hence the same is true for the space of corresponding Casimir operators.

=== Relation to the Laplacian on G ===
If $G$ is a compact Lie group with Lie algebra $\mathfrak{g}$, the choice of a nondegenerate invariant bilinear form on $\mathfrak{g}$ corresponds to a choice of bi-invariant Riemannian metric on $G$. Then under the identification of the universal enveloping algebra of $\mathfrak{g}$ with the left invariant differential operators on $G$, the Casimir element of the bilinear form on $\mathfrak{g}$ maps to the Laplacian of $G$ (with respect to the corresponding bi-invariant metric).

=== Casimir elements and representation theory ===
By Racah's theorem, for a semisimple Lie algebra the dimension of the center of its universal enveloping algebra is equal to its rank. The Casimir operator gives the concept of the Laplacian on a general semisimple Lie group; but there is no unique analogue of the Laplacian, for rank > 1.

By definition any member of the center of the universal enveloping algebra commutes with all other elements in the algebra. By Schur's Lemma, in any irreducible representation of the Lie algebra, any Casimir element is thus proportional to the identity. The eigenvalues of all Casimir elements can be used to classify the representations of the Lie algebra (and hence, also of its Lie group).

Physical mass and spin are examples of these eigenvalues, as are many other quantum numbers found in quantum mechanics. Superficially, topological quantum numbers form an exception to this pattern; although deeper theories hint that these are two facets of the same phenomenon..

Let $L(\lambda)$ be the finite dimensional highest weight module of weight $\lambda$. Then the quadratic Casimir element $\Omega$ acts on $L(\lambda)$ by the constant

$$\langle \lambda, \lambda + 2 \rho \rangle=\langle\lambda+\rho,\lambda+\rho\rangle - \langle\rho,\rho\rangle ,$$

where $\rho$ is the weight defined by half the sum of the positive roots. If $L(\lambda)$ is nontrivial (i.e. if $\lambda\neq 0$), then this constant is nonzero. After all, since $\lambda$ is dominant, if $\lambda\neq 0$, then $\langle\lambda,\lambda\rangle>0$ and $\langle\lambda,\rho\rangle\geq 0$, showing that $\langle\lambda,\lambda+2\rho\rangle >0$. This observation plays an important role in the proof of Weyl's theorem on complete reducibility. It is also possible to prove the nonvanishing of the eigenvalue in a more abstract way—without using an explicit formula for the eigenvalue—using Cartan's criterion; see Sections 4.3 and 6.2 in the book of Humphreys.

== Symmetric invariant tensors of simple Lie algebras ==
A Casimir element of order $m$ corresponds to a symmetric invariant tensor of the same order via $C_{(m)} = \kappa^{i_1i_2\cdots i_m} X_{i_1}X_{i_2}\cdots X_{i_m}$. Constructing and relating Casimir elements is equivalent to doing the same for symmetric invariant tensors.

=== Construction of symmetric invariant tensors ===
Symmetric invariant tensors may be constructed as symmetrized traces in the defining representation

$$k^{(m)}_{i_1i_2\cdots i_m} = \text{Tr}\left(X_{(i_1}X_{i_2}\cdots X_{i_m)}\right)$$

where indices are raised and lowered by the Killing form, and symmetrized under all permutations.

It is also possible to construct symmetric invariant tensors from the antisymmetric invariant tensors of the type

$$\Omega^{(2m-1)}_{i_1i_2\cdots i_{2m-1}} = f_{i_1[i_2}^{j_1} \cdots f^{j_{m-1}}_{i_{2m-3}i_{2m-2}]} k^{(m)}_{j_1\cdots j_{m-1}i_{2m-1}}$$

The symmetric invariant tensor

$$t_{i_1i_2\cdots i_m}^{(m)} = \Omega^{(2m-1)}_{j_1j_2\cdots j_{2m-2} i_m} f_{i_1}^{j_1j_2}\cdots f_{i_{m-1}}^{j_{2m-2}j_{2m-3}}$$

is traceless for $m>2$. Such invariant tensors are orthogonal to one another in the sense that $t^{(m)}_{i_1i_2\cdots i_m} \left(t^{(n)}\right)^{i_1i_2\cdots i_m i_{m+1}\cdots i_n} = 0$ if $n>m$.

In the case of the simple Lie algebra $A_l=\mathfrak{sl}_{l+1}$, let us introduce the fully symmetric tensor of order three $d_{ijk}$ such that, in the defining representation,

$$X_iX_j = \frac{2}{\ell+1} \delta_{ij} + f_{ij}^k X_k + d_{ij}^k X_k$$

Then the Sudbery symmetric invariant tensors are

$$d^{(2)}_{i_1i_2} = \delta_{i_1i_2}$$
$$d^{(3)}_{i_1i_2i_3} = d_{i_1i_2i_3}$$
$$d^{(4)}_{i_1i_2i_3i_4} = d_{(i_1i_2}{}^j d_{i_3i_4)j}$$
$$d^{(5)}_{i_1i_2i_3i_4i_5} = d_{(i_1i_2}{}^j d^j{}_{i_3}{}^kd_{i_4i_5)k}$$

=== Relations between symmetric invariant tensors ===
For a simple Lie algebra of rank $r$, there are $r$ algebraically independent symmetric invariant tensors. Therefore, any such tensor can be expressed in terms of $r$ given tensors. There is a systematic method for deriving complete sets of identities between symmetric invariant tensors.

In the case of the Lie algebra $A_l$, the symmetric invariant tensors $t^{(m)}$ obey $t^{(m>l+1)}=0$. Reexpressing these tensors in terms of other families such as $d^{(m)}$ or $k^{(m)}$ gives rise to nontrivial relations within these other families. For example, the Sudbery tensors $d^{(m>l+1)}$ may be expressed in terms of $d^{(2)},\cdots , d^{(l+1)}$, with relations of the type

$$d^{(4)}_{i_1i_2i_3i_4}\ \underset{l=2}{=}\ \frac13\delta_{(i_1i_2}\delta_{i_3i_4)}$$
$$d^{(5)}_{i_1i_2i_3i_4i_5}\ \underset{l=2}{=}\ \frac13 d_{(i_1i_2i_3}\delta_{i_4i_5)}$$
$$d^{(5)}_{i_1i_2i_3i_4i_5}\ \underset{l=3}{=}\ \frac23 d_{(i_1i_2i_3}\delta_{i_4i_5)}$$

Structure constants also obey identities that are not directly related to symmetric invariant tensors, for example

$$3d_{ab}{}^{e}d_{cde}-f_{ac}{}^{e}f_{bde}-f_{ad}{}^{e}f_{bce}\ \underset{l=2}{=}\ \delta_{ac}\delta_{bd}+\delta_{ad}\delta_{bc}-\delta_{ab}\delta_{cd}$$

== Examples ==
=== Case of sl(2) ===
The Lie algebra $\mathfrak{sl}_2 (\mathbb{C})$ consists of two-by-two complex matrices with zero trace. There are three standard basis elements, $e$,$f$, and $h$, with

$$\begin{align}
e &= \begin{bmatrix}
0 & 1\\
0 & 0
\end{bmatrix}, &
f &= \begin{bmatrix}
0 & 0\\
1 & 0
\end{bmatrix}, &
h &= \begin{bmatrix}
1 &  0\\
0 & -1
\end{bmatrix}.
\end{align}$$

The commutators are

$$\begin{align}[]
[e, f] &=   h, &
[h, f] &= -2f, &
[h, e] &=  2e.
\end{align}$$

One can show that the Casimir element is

$$\Omega = ef + fe + \frac{1}{2}h^2 = \frac{1}{2}h^2 + h + 2fe.$$

This expression lives in the universal enveloping algebra $U(\mathfrak{sl}_2(\mathbb{C}))$, not the algebra of $2\times 2$ matrices, so care should be taken not to plug the above $2\times 2$ matrices into this formula and use matrix multiplication to simplify.

As an example of how the Casimir element acts on a representation, consider the adjoint representation of $\mathfrak{sl}_2(\mathbb{C})$ on itself. Using the ordered basis $(e,h,f)$ for $\mathfrak{sl}_2(\mathbb{C})$, we can express the adjoint action of any element as a $3\times 3$ matrix. In particular:

$$\begin{align}
\mathsf{Ad}_e &= \begin{bmatrix}
0 & -2 & 0 \\
0 & 0 & 1 \\
0 & 0 & 0 \\
\end{bmatrix}, &
\mathsf{Ad}_f &= \begin{bmatrix}
0 & 0 & 0 \\
-1 & 0 & 0 \\
0 & 2 & 0 \\
\end{bmatrix}, &
\mathsf{Ad}_h &= \begin{bmatrix}
2 & 0 & 0 \\
0 & 0 & 0 \\
0 & 0 & -2 \\
\end{bmatrix}
\end{align}$$

The Casimir element then acts on this representation by the matrix

$$\begin{align}
\mathsf{Ad}_\Omega
&= \mathsf{Ad}_e\mathsf{Ad}_f + \mathsf{Ad}_f \mathsf{Ad}_e + \frac{1}{2} \mathsf{Ad}_h^2
\\
&=
\begin{bmatrix}
0 & -2 & 0 \\
0 & 0 & 1 \\
0 & 0 & 0 \\
\end{bmatrix}
\begin{bmatrix}
0 & 0 & 0 \\
-1 & 0 & 0 \\
0 & 2 & 0 \\
\end{bmatrix}
+
\begin{bmatrix}
0 & 0 & 0 \\
-1 & 0 & 0 \\
0 & 2 & 0 \\
\end{bmatrix}
\begin{bmatrix}
0 & -2 & 0 \\
0 & 0 & 1 \\
0 & 0 & 0 \\
\end{bmatrix}
+\frac{1}{2}
\begin{bmatrix}
2 & 0 & 0 \\
0 & 0 & 0 \\
0 & 0 & -2 \\
\end{bmatrix}^2
\\
&=
\begin{bmatrix}
4 & 0 & 0 \\
0 & 4 & 0 \\
0 & 0 & 4 \\
\end{bmatrix}
\end{align}$$

=== Case of so(3) ===
The Lie algebra $\mathfrak{so}(3)$ is the Lie algebra of SO(3), the rotation group for three-dimensional Euclidean space. It is simple of rank 1, and so it has a single independent Casimir. The Killing form for the rotation group is just the Kronecker delta, and so the Casimir invariant is simply the sum of the squares of the generators $L_x,\, L_y,\, L_z$ of the algebra. That is, the Casimir invariant is given by

$$L^2 = L_x^2 + L_y^2 + L_z^2.$$

Consider the irreducible representation of $\mathfrak{so}(3)$ in which the largest eigenvalue of $L_z$ is $\ell$, where the possible values of $\ell$ are $0,\, \frac{1}{2},\, 1,\, \frac{3}{2},\, \ldots$. The invariance of the Casimir operator implies that it is a multiple of the identity operator $I$. This constant can be computed explicitly, giving the following result

$$L^2 = L_x^2 + L_y^2 + L_z^2 = \ell(\ell + 1)I.$$

In quantum mechanics, the scalar value $\ell$ is referred to as the total angular momentum. For finite-dimensional matrix-valued representations of the rotation group, $\ell$ always takes on integer values (for bosonic representations) or half-integer values (for fermionic representations).

For a given value of $\ell$, the matrix representation is $(2\ell + 1)$-dimensional. Thus, for example, the three-dimensional representation for $\mathfrak{so}(3)$ corresponds to $\ell = 1$, and is given by the generators

$$\begin{align}
L_x &=
i\begin{pmatrix}
0& 0&  0\\
0& 0& -1\\
0& 1&  0
\end{pmatrix}; &
L_y &=
i\begin{pmatrix}
0& 0& 1\\
0& 0& 0\\
-1& 0& 0
\end{pmatrix}; &
L_z &=
i\begin{pmatrix}
0& -1& 0\\
1&  0& 0\\
0&  0& 0
\end{pmatrix},
\end{align}$$

where the factors of $i$ are needed for agreement with the physics convention (used here) that the generators should be skew-self-adjoint operators.

The quadratic Casimir invariant can then easily be computed by hand, with the result that

$$L^2 = L_x^2 + L_y^2 + L_z^2 = 2
\begin{pmatrix}
1& 0& 0\\
0& 1& 0\\
0& 0& 1
\end{pmatrix}$$

as $\ell(\ell + 1) = 2$ when $\ell = 1$.

This is what is meant when we say that the eigenvalues of the Casimir operator are used to classify the irreducible representations of a Lie algebra (and of an associated Lie group): two irreducible representations of a Lie Algebra are equivalent if and only if their Casimir element have the same eigenvalue. In this case, the irreps of $\mathfrak{so}(3)$ are completely determined by the value of $\ell$, or equivalently, by the value of $\ell(\ell + 1)$. Similarly, the two dimensional representation has a basis given by the Pauli matrices, which correspond to spin 1/2, and one can again check the formula for the Casimir by direct computation.

== See also ==
- Harish-Chandra isomorphism
- Pauli–Lubanski pseudovector
- Clebsch–Gordan coefficients
