= Representation theory of diffeomorphism groups =

Representation theory of the symmetries of manifolds

In mathematics, a source for the representation theory of the group of diffeomorphisms of a smooth manifold M is the initial observation that (for M connected) that group acts transitively on M.

== History ==
A survey paper from 1975 of the subject by Anatoly Vershik, Israel Gelfand and M. I. Graev attributes the original interest in the topic to research in theoretical physics of the local current algebra, in the preceding years. Research on the finite configuration representations was in papers of R. S. Ismagilov (1971), and A. A. Kirillov (1974). The representations of interest in physics are described as a cross product C^{∞}(M)·Diff(M).

== Constructions ==
Let therefore M be a n-dimensional connected differentiable manifold, and x be any point on it. Let Diff(M) be the orientation-preserving diffeomorphism group of M (only the identity component of mappings homotopic to the identity diffeomorphism if you wish) and Diff_{x}^{1}(M) the stabilizer of x. Then, M is identified as a homogeneous space

Diff(M)/Diff_{x}^{1}(M).

From the algebraic point of view instead, $C^\infty(M)$ is the algebra of smooth functions over M and $I_x(M)$ is the ideal of smooth functions vanishing at x. Let $I_x^n(M)$ be the ideal of smooth functions which vanish up to the n-1th partial derivative at x. $I_x^n(M)$ is invariant under the group Diff_{x}^{1}(M) of diffeomorphisms fixing x. For n > 0 the group Diff_{x}^{n}(M) is defined as the subgroup of Diff_{x}^{1}(M) which acts as the identity on $I_x(M)/I_x^n(M)$. So, we have a descending chain

Diff(M) ⊃ Diff_{x}^{1}(M) ⊃ ... ⊃ Diff_{x}^{n}(M) ⊃ ...

Here Diff_{x}^{n}(M) is a normal subgroup of Diff_{x}^{1}(M), which means we can look at the quotient group

Diff_{x}^{1}(M)/Diff_{x}^{n}(M).

Using harmonic analysis, a real- or complex-valued function (with some sufficiently nice topological properties) on the diffeomorphism group can be decomposed into Diff_{x}^{1}(M) representation-valued functions over M.

== The supply of representations ==
So what are the representations of Diff_{x}^{1}(M)? Let's use the fact that if we have a group homomorphism φ:G → H, then if we have a H-representation, we can obtain a restricted G-representation. So, if we have a rep of

Diff_{x}^{1}(M)/Diff_{x}^{n}(M),

we can obtain a rep of Diff_{x}^{1}(M).

Let's look at

Diff_{x}^{1}(M)/Diff_{x}^{2}(M)

first. This is isomorphic to the general linear group GL^{+}(n, R) (and because we're only considering orientation preserving diffeomorphisms and so the determinant is positive). What are the reps of GL^{+}(n, R)?

$$GL^+(n,\mathbb{R})\cong \mathbb{R}^+\times SL(n,\mathbb{R})$$.

We know the reps of SL(n, R) are simply tensors over n dimensions. How about the R^{+} part? That corresponds to the density, or in other words, how the tensor rescales under the determinant of the Jacobian of the diffeomorphism at x. (Think of it as the conformal weight if you will, except that there is no conformal structure here). (Incidentally, there is nothing preventing us from having a complex density).

So, we have just discovered the tensor reps (with density) of the diffeomorphism group.

Let's look at

Diff_{x}^{1}(M)/Diff_{x}^{n}(M).

This is a finite-dimensional group. We have the chain

Diff_{x}^{1}(M)/Diff_{x}^{1}(M) ⊂ ... ⊂ Diff_{x}^{1}(M)/Diff_{x}^{n}(M) ⊂ ...

Here, the "⊂" signs should really be read to mean an injective homomorphism, but since it is canonical, we can pretend these quotient groups are embedded one within the other.

Any rep of

Diff_{x}^{1}(M)/Diff_{x}^{m}(M)

can automatically be turned into a rep of

Diff_{x}^{1}/Diff_{x}^{n}(M)

if n > m. Let's say we have a rep of

Diff_{x}^{1}/Diff_{x}^{p + 2}

which doesn't arise from a rep of

Diff_{x}^{1}/Diff_{x}^{p + 1}.

Then, we call the fiber bundle with that rep as the fiber (i.e. Diff_{x}^{1}/Diff_{x}^{p + 2} is the structure group) a jet bundle of order p.

Side remark: This is really the method of induced representations with the smaller group being Diff_{x}^{1}(M) and the larger group being Diff(M).

== Intertwining structure ==
In general, the space of sections of the tensor and jet bundles would be an irreducible representation and we often look at a subrepresentation of them. We can study the structure of these reps through the study of the intertwiners between them.

If the fiber is not an irreducible representation of Diff_{x}^{1}(M), then we can have a nonzero intertwiner mapping each fiber pointwise into a smaller quotient representation. Also, the exterior derivative is an intertwiner from the space of differential forms to another of higher order. (Other derivatives are not, because connections aren't invariant under diffeomorphisms, though they are covariant.) The partial derivative isn't diffeomorphism invariant. There is a derivative intertwiner taking sections of a jet bundle of order p into sections of a jet bundle of order p + 1.
