= Massless particle =

Particle whose invariant mass is zero

In particle physics, a massless particle is an elementary particle whose invariant mass is zero. The only confirmed massless particle is the photon.

== Other particles and quasiparticles ==
Name	Symbol	Antiparticle	Charge (e)	Spin	Interaction mediated	Experimentally confirmed
photon	γ	Self	0	1	electromagnetism	Confirmed to exist. Confirmed massless.
gluon	g	Self	0	1	strong	Indirectly confirmed to exist.
graviton	G	Self	0	2	gravitation	Never observed. Entirely hypothetical.

=== Standard Model gauge bosons ===
The photon (carrier of electromagnetism) is one of two known gauge bosons thought to be massless. The photon is well-known from direct observation to exist and be massless.

The other massless gauge boson is the gluon (carrier of the strong force) whose existence has been inferred from particle collision decay products; it is expected to be massless, but a zero mass has not been confirmed by experiment. Although there are compelling theoretical reasons to believe that gluons are massless, they can never be observed as free particles because they are confined within hadrons, and hence their presumed lack of rest mass cannot be confirmed by any feasible experiment.

=== Hypothetical graviton ===
The graviton is a hypothetical tensor boson proposed to be the carrier of gravitational force in some quantum theories of gravity, but no such theory has been successfully incorporated into the Standard Model, so the Standard Model neither predicts any such particle nor requires it, and no gravitational quantum particle has been indicated by experiment. Whether a graviton would be massless if it existed is likewise an open question.

=== Quasiparticles ===
The Weyl fermion discovered in 2015 is also expected to be massless, but these are not actual particles. At one time neutrinos were thought to perhaps be Weyl fermions, but when they were discovered to have mass, that left no fundamental particles of the Weyl type.

The Weyl fermions discovered in 2015 are merely quasiparticles – composite motions found in the structure of molecular lattices that have particle-like behavior, but are not themselves real particles. Weyl fermions in matter are like phonons, which are also quasiparticles. No real particle that is a Weyl fermion has been found to exist, and there is no compelling theoretical reason that requires them to exist.

Neutrinos were originally thought to be massless. However, because neutrinos change flavour as they travel, at least two of the types of neutrinos must have mass (and cannot be Weyl fermions). The discovery of this phenomenon, known as neutrino oscillation, led to Canadian scientist Arthur B. McDonald and Japanese scientist Takaaki Kajita sharing the 2015 Nobel Prize in Physics.

== See also ==
- Gravitational wave
- Relativistic particle
