= List of Lie groups topics =

This is a list of Lie group topics, by Wikipedia page.

== Examples ==
See Table of Lie groups for a list

- General linear group, special linear group
  - SL_{2}(R)
  - SL_{2}(C)
- Unitary group, special unitary group
  - SU(2)
  - SU(3)
- Orthogonal group, special orthogonal group
  - Rotation group SO(3)
  - SO(8)
  - Generalized orthogonal group, generalized special orthogonal group
    - The special unitary group SU(1,1) is the unit sphere in the ring of coquaternions. It is the group of hyperbolic motions of the Poincaré disk model of the Hyperbolic plane.
    - Lorentz group
  - Spinor group
- Symplectic group
- Exceptional groups
  - G_{2}
  - F_{4}
  - E_{6}
  - E_{7}
  - E_{8}
- Affine group
- Euclidean group
- Poincaré group
- Heisenberg group

== Lie algebras ==
- Commutator
- Jacobi identity
- Universal enveloping algebra
- Baker–Campbell–Hausdorff formula
- Casimir invariant
- Killing form
- Kac–Moody algebra
- Affine Lie algebra
- Loop algebra
- Graded Lie algebra

== Foundational results ==
- One-parameter group, One-parameter subgroup
- Matrix exponential
- Infinitesimal transformation
- Lie's third theorem
- Maurer–Cartan form
- Cartan's theorem
- Cartan's criterion
- Local Lie group
- Formal group law
- Hilbert's fifth problem
- Hilbert–Smith conjecture
- Lie group decompositions
- Real form (Lie theory)
- Complex Lie group
- Complexification (Lie group)

== Semisimple theory ==
- Simple Lie group
- Compact Lie group, Compact real form
- Semisimple Lie algebra
- Root system
- Simply laced group
  - ADE classification
- Maximal torus
- Weyl group
- Dynkin diagram
- Weyl character formula

== Representation theory ==
- Representation of a Lie group
- Representation of a Lie algebra
- Adjoint representation of a Lie group
- Adjoint representation of a Lie algebra
- Unitary representation
- Weight (representation theory)
- Peter–Weyl theorem
- Borel–Weil theorem
- Kirillov character formula
- Representation theory of SU(2)
- Representation theory of SL2(R)

== Applications ==
=== Physical theories ===
- Pauli matrices
- Gell-Mann matrices
- Poisson bracket
- Noether's theorem
- Wigner's classification
- Gauge theory
- Grand Unified Theory
- Supergroup
- Lie superalgebra
- Twistor theory
- Anyon
- Witt algebra
- Virasoro algebra

=== Geometry ===
- Erlangen programme
- Homogeneous space
  - Principal homogeneous space
- Invariant theory
- Lie derivative
- Darboux derivative
- Lie groupoid
- Lie algebroid

=== Discrete groups ===
- Lattice (group)
- Lattice (discrete subgroup)
- Frieze group
- Wallpaper group
- Space group
- Crystallographic group
- Fuchsian group
- Modular group
- Congruence subgroup
- Kleinian group
- Discrete Heisenberg group
- Clifford–Klein form

=== Algebraic groups ===
- Borel subgroup
- Arithmetic group

== Special functions ==
- Dunkl operator

=== Automorphic forms ===
- Modular form
- Langlands program

== People ==
- Sophus Lie (1842 – 1899)
- Wilhelm Killing (1847 – 1923)
- Élie Cartan (1869 – 1951)
- Hermann Weyl (1885 – 1955)
- Harish-Chandra (1923 – 1983)
- Lajos Pukánszky (1928 – 1996)
- Bertram Kostant (1928 – 2017)
