= Representation of a Lie group =

Group representation

In mathematics and theoretical physics, a representation of a Lie group is a linear action of a Lie group on a vector space. Equivalently, a representation is a smooth homomorphism of the group into the group of invertible operators on the vector space. Representations play an important role in the study of continuous symmetry. A great deal is known about such representations, a basic tool in their study being the use of the corresponding 'infinitesimal' representations of Lie algebras.

== Finite-dimensional representations ==
=== Representations ===
A complex representation of a group is an action by a group on a finite-dimensional vector space over the field $\mathbb C$. A representation of the Lie group G, acting on an n-dimensional vector space V over $\mathbb C$ is then a smooth group homomorphism

$$\Pi:G\rightarrow\operatorname{GL}(V)$$,

where $\operatorname{GL}(V)$ is the general linear group of all invertible linear transformations of $V$ under their composition. Since all n-dimensional spaces are isomorphic, the group $\operatorname{GL}(V)$ can be identified with the group of the invertible, complex $n\times n$ matrices, generally called $\operatorname{GL}(n;\mathbb C).$ Smoothness of the map $\Pi$ can be regarded as a technicality, in that any continuous homomorphism will automatically be smooth.

We can alternatively describe a representation of a Lie group $G$ as a linear action of $G$ on a vector space $V$. Notationally, we would then write $g\cdot v$ in place of $\Pi(g)v$ for the way a group element $g\in G$ acts on the vector $v\in V$.

A typical example in which representations arise in physics would be the study of a linear partial differential equation having symmetry group $G$. Although the individual solutions of the equation may not be invariant under the action of $G$, the space $V$ of all solutions is invariant under the action of $G$. Thus, $V$ constitutes a representation of $G$. See the example of SO(3), discussed below.

=== Basic definitions ===
If the homomorphism $\Pi$ is injective (i.e., a monomorphism), the representation is said to be faithful.

If a basis for the complex vector space V is chosen, the representation can be expressed as a homomorphism into general linear group $\operatorname{GL}(n;\mathbb C)$. This is known as a matrix representation. Two representations of G on vector spaces V, W are equivalent if they have the same matrix representations with respect to some choices of bases for V and W.

Given a representation $\Pi:G\rightarrow\operatorname{GL}(V)$, we say that a subspace W of V is an invariant subspace if $\Pi(g)w\in W$ for all $g\in G$ and $w\in W$. The representation is said to be irreducible if the only invariant subspaces of V are the zero space and V itself. For certain types of Lie groups, namely compact and semisimple groups, every finite-dimensional representation decomposes as a direct sum of irreducible representations, a property known as complete reducibility. For such groups, a typical goal of representation theory is to classify all finite-dimensional irreducible representations of the given group, up to isomorphism. (See the Classification section below.)

A unitary representation on a finite-dimensional inner product space is defined in the same way, except that $\Pi$ is required to map into the group of unitary operators. If G is a compact Lie group, every finite-dimensional representation is equivalent to a unitary one.

=== Lie algebra representations ===
Each representation of a Lie group G gives rise to a representation of its Lie algebra; this correspondence is discussed in detail in subsequent sections. See representation of Lie algebras for the Lie algebra theory.

== An example: The rotation group SO(3) ==
In quantum mechanics, the time-independent Schrödinger equation, $\hat{H}\psi=E\psi$ plays an important role. In the three-dimensional case, if $\hat{H}$ has rotational symmetry, then the space $V_E$ of solutions to $\hat{H}\psi=E\psi$ will be invariant under the action of SO(3). Thus, $V_E$ will—for each fixed value of $E$—constitute a representation of SO(3), which is typically finite dimensional. In trying to solve $\hat{H}\psi=E\psi$, it helps to know what all possible finite-dimensional representations of SO(3) look like. The representation theory of SO(3) plays a key role, for example, in the mathematical analysis of the hydrogen atom.

Every standard textbook on quantum mechanics contains an analysis which essentially classifies finite-dimensional irreducible representations of SO(3), by means of its Lie algebra. (The commutation relations among the angular momentum operators are just the relations for the Lie algebra $\mathfrak{so}(3)$ of SO(3).) One subtlety of this analysis is that the representations of the group and the Lie algebra are not in one-to-one correspondence, a point that is critical in understanding the distinction between integer spin and half-integer spin.

=== Ordinary representations ===
The rotation group SO(3) is a compact Lie group and thus every finite-dimensional representation of SO(3) decomposes as a direct sum of irreducible representations. The group SO(3) has one irreducible representation in each odd dimension. For each non-negative integer $k$, the irreducible representation of dimension $2k+1$ can be realized as the space $V_k$ of homogeneous harmonic polynomials on $\mathbb{R}^3$ of degree $k$. Here, SO(3) acts on $V_k$ in the usual way that rotations act on functions on $\mathbb{R}^3$:

$$(\Pi(R)f)(x)=f(R^{-1}x)\quad R\in \operatorname{SO}(3).$$

The restriction to the unit sphere $S^2$ of the elements of $V_k$ are the spherical harmonics of degree $k$.

If, say, $k=1$, then all polynomials that are homogeneous of degree one are harmonic, and we obtain a three-dimensional space $V_1$ spanned by the linear polynomials $x$, $y$, and $z$. If $k=2$, the space $V_2$ is spanned by the polynomials $xy$, $xz$, $yz$, $x^2-y^2$, and $x^2-z^2$.

As noted above, the finite-dimensional representations of SO(3) arise naturally when studying the time-independent Schrödinger equation for a radial potential, such as the hydrogen atom, as a reflection of the rotational symmetry of the problem. (See the role played by the spherical harmonics in the mathematical analysis of hydrogen.)

=== Projective representations ===
If we look at the Lie algebra $\mathfrak{so}(3)$ of SO(3), this Lie algebra is isomorphic to the Lie algebra $\mathfrak{su}(2)$ of SU(2). By the representation theory of $\mathfrak{su}(2)$, there is then one irreducible representation of $\mathfrak{so}(3)$ in every dimension. The even-dimensional representations, however, do not correspond to representations of the group SO(3). These so-called "fractional spin" representations do, however, correspond to projective representations of SO(3). These representations arise in the quantum mechanics of particles with fractional spin, such as an electron.

== Operations on representations ==
In this section, we describe three basic operations on representations. See also the corresponding constructions for representations of a Lie algebra.

=== Direct sums ===
If we have two representations of a group $G$, $\Pi_1:G\rightarrow GL(V_1)$ and $\Pi_2:G\rightarrow GL(V_2)$, then the direct sum would have $V_1\oplus V_2$ as the underlying vector space, with the action of the group given by

$$\Pi(g)(v_1,v_2)=(\Pi_1(g)v_1,\Pi_2(g)v_2),$$

for all $v_1\in V_1,$ $v_2\in V_2$, and $g\in G$.

Certain types of Lie groups—notably, compact Lie groups—have the property that every finite-dimensional representation is isomorphic to a direct sum of irreducible representations. In such cases, the classification of representations reduces to the classification of irreducible representations. See Weyl's theorem on complete reducibility.

=== Tensor products of representations ===
If we have two representations of a group $G$, $\Pi_1:G\rightarrow GL(V_1)$ and $\Pi_2:G\rightarrow GL(V_2)$, then the tensor product of the representations would have the tensor product vector space $V_1\otimes V_2$ as the underlying vector space, with the action of $G$ uniquely determined by the assumption that

$$\Pi(g)(v_1\otimes v_2)=(\Pi_1(g)v_1)\otimes(\Pi_2(g)v_2)$$

for all $v_1\in V_1$ and $v_2\in V_2$. That is to say, $\Pi(g)=\Pi_1(g)\otimes\Pi_2(g)$.

The Lie algebra representation $\pi$ associated to the tensor product representation $\Pi$ is given by the formula:

$$\pi(X)=\pi_1(X)\otimes I+I\otimes\pi_2(X).$$

The tensor product of two irreducible representations is usually not irreducible; a basic problem in representation theory is then to decompose tensor products of irreducible representations as a direct sum of irreducible subspaces. This problem goes under the name of "addition of angular momentum" or "Clebsch–Gordan theory" in the physics literature.

=== Dual representations ===
Let $G$ be a Lie group and $\Pi:G\rightarrow GL(V)$ be a representation of G. Let $V^*$ be the dual space, that is, the space of linear functionals on $V$. Then we can define a representation $\Pi^*:G\rightarrow GL(V^*)$ by the formula

$$\Pi^*(g)=(\Pi(g^{-1}))^\operatorname{tr},$$

where for any operator $A:V\rightarrow V$, the transpose operator $A^\operatorname{tr}:V^*\rightarrow V^*$ is defined as the "composition with $A$" operator:

$$(A^\operatorname{tr}\phi)(v)=\phi(Av).$$

(If we work in a basis, then $A^{\operatorname{tr}}$ is just the usual matrix transpose of $A$.) The inverse in the definition of $\Pi^*$ is needed to ensure that $\Pi^*$ is actually a representation of $G$, in light of the identity $(AB)^\operatorname{tr}=B^\operatorname{tr}A^\operatorname{tr}$.

The dual of an irreducible representation is always irreducible, but may or may not be isomorphic to the original representation. In the case of the group SU(3), for example, the irreducible representations are labeled by a pair $(m_1,m_2)$ of non-negative integers. The dual of the representation associated to $(m_1,m_2)$ is the representation associated to $(m_2,m_1)$.

== Lie group versus Lie algebra representations ==
=== Overview ===
In many cases, it is convenient to study representations of a Lie group by studying representations of the associated Lie algebra. In general, however, not every representation of the Lie algebra comes from a representation of the group. For example, this underlies the distinction between integer spin and half-integer spin in quantum mechanics. On the other hand, if G is a simply connected group, then a theorem says that we do, in fact, get a one-to-one correspondence between the group and Lie algebra representations.

Let G be a Lie group with Lie algebra $\mathfrak g$, and assume that a representation $\pi$ of $\mathfrak g$ is at hand. The Lie correspondence may be employed for obtaining group representations of the connected component of G. Roughly speaking, this is effected by taking the matrix exponential of the matrices of the Lie algebra representation. A subtlety arises if G is not simply connected. This may result in projective representations or, in physics parlance, multi-valued representations of G. These are actually representations of the universal covering group of G.

These results will be explained more fully below.

The Lie correspondence gives results only for the connected component of the groups, and thus the other components of the full group are treated separately by giving representatives for matrices representing these components, one for each component. These form (representatives of) the zeroth homotopy group of G. For example, in the case of the four-component Lorentz group, representatives of space inversion and time reversal must be put in by hand. Further illustrations will be drawn from the representation theory of the Lorentz group below.

=== The exponential mapping ===
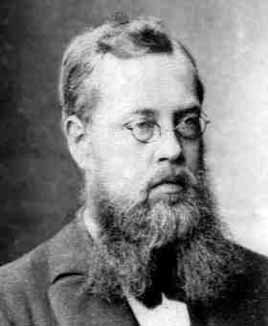
Sophus Lie, the originator of Lie theory. The theory of manifolds was not discovered in Lie's time, so he worked locally with subsets of $\R^n.$ The structure would today be called a local group.

If $G$ is a Lie group with Lie algebra $\mathfrak g$, then we have the exponential map from $\mathfrak g$ to $G$, written as

$$X\mapsto e^X,\quad X\in\mathfrak g.$$

If $G$ is a matrix Lie group, the expression $e^X$ can be computed by the usual power series for the exponential. In any Lie group, there exist neighborhoods $U$ of the identity in $G$ and $V$ of the origin in $\mathfrak g$ with the property that every $g$ in $U$ can be written uniquely as $g=e^X$ with $X\in V$. That is, the exponential map has a local inverse. In most groups, this is only local; that is, the exponential map is typically neither one-to-one nor onto.

=== Lie algebra representations from group representations ===
It is always possible to pass from a representation of a Lie group G to a representation of its Lie algebra $\mathfrak{g}.$ If Π : G → GL(V) is a group representation for some vector space V, then its pushforward (differential) at the identity, or Lie map, $\pi : \mathfrak{g} \to \text{End}(V)$ is a Lie algebra representation. It is explicitly computed using

$\pi(X) = \left .\frac{d}{dt}\Pi(e^{tX})\right|_{t = 0}, \quad X \in \mathfrak{g}.$	G6

A basic property relating $\Pi$ and $\pi$ involves the exponential map:

$$\Pi(e^X)=e^{\pi(X)}.$$

The question we wish to investigate is whether every representation of $\mathfrak g$ arises in this way from representations of the group $G$. As we shall see, this is the case when $G$ is simply connected.

=== Group representations from Lie algebra representations ===
The main result of this section is the following:

Theorem: If $G$ is simply connected, then every representation $\pi$ of the Lie algebra $\mathfrak g$ of $G$ comes from a representation $\Pi$ of $G$ itself.

From this we easily deduce the following:

Corollary: If $G$ is connected but not simply connected, every representation $\pi$ of $\mathfrak g$ comes from a representation $\Pi$ of $\tilde G$, the universal cover of $G$. If $\pi$ is irreducible, then $\Pi$ descends to a projective representation of $G$.

A projective representation is one in which each $\Pi(g),\,g\in G,$ is defined only up to multiplication by a constant. In quantum physics, it is natural to allow projective representations in addition to ordinary ones, because states are really defined only up to a constant. (That is to say, if $\psi$ is a vector in the quantum Hilbert space, then $c\psi$ represents the same physical state for any constant $c$.) Every finite-dimensional projective representation of a connected Lie group $G$ comes from an ordinary representation of the universal cover $\tilde G$ of $G$. Conversely, as we will discuss below, every irreducible ordinary representation of $\tilde G$ descends to a projective representation of $G$. In the physics literature, projective representations are often described as multi-valued representations (i.e., each $\Pi(g)$ does not have a single value but a whole family of values). This phenomenon is important to the study of fractional spin in quantum mechanics.

Here V is a finite-dimensional vector space, GL(V) is the set of all invertible linear transformations on V and $\mathfrak{gl}(V)$ is its Lie algebra. The maps π and Π are Lie algebra and group representations respectively, and exp is the exponential mapping. The diagram commutes only up to a sign if Π is projective.

We now outline the proof of the main results above. Suppose $\pi : \mathfrak{g} \to \mathfrak{gl}(V)$ is a representation of $\mathfrak g$ on a vector space V. If there is going to be an associated Lie group representation $\Pi$, it must satisfy the exponential relation of the previous subsection. Now, in light of the local invertibility of the exponential, we can define a map $\Pi$ from a neighborhood $U$ of the identity in $G$ by this relation:

$$\Pi(e^X)=e^{\pi(X)},\quad g=e^X\in U.$$

A key question is then this: Is this locally defined map a "local homomorphism"? (This question would apply even in the special case where the exponential mapping is globally one-to-one and onto; in that case, $\Pi$ would be a globally defined map, but it is not obvious why $\Pi$ would be a homomorphism.) The answer to this question is yes: $\Pi$ is a local homomorphism, and this can be established using the Baker–Campbell–Hausdorff formula.

If $G$ is connected, then every element of $G$ is at least a product of exponentials of elements of $\mathfrak g$. Thus, we can tentatively define $\Pi$ globally as follows.

$$\begin{align} \Pi(g = e^{X}) &\equiv e^{\pi(X)}, && X \in \mathfrak g, \quad g = e^{X} \in \operatorname{im}(\exp),\\ \Pi(g = g_1g_2\cdots g_n) &\equiv \Pi(g_1)\Pi(g_2)\cdots \Pi(g_n), && g \notin \operatorname{im}(\exp), \quad g_1 , g_2, \ldots, g_n \in \operatorname{im}(\exp). \end{align}$$	G2

Note, however, that the representation of a given group element as a product of exponentials is very far from unique, so it is very far from clear that $\Pi$ is actually well defined.

To address the question of whether $\Pi$ is well defined, we connect each group element $g\in G$ to the identity using a continuous path. It is then possible to define $\Pi$ along the path, and to show that the value of $\Pi(g)$ is unchanged under continuous deformation of the path with endpoints fixed. If $G$ is simply connected, any path starting at the identity and ending at $g$ can be continuously deformed into any other such path, showing that $\Pi(g)$ is fully independent of the choice of path. Given that the initial definition of $\Pi$ near the identity was a local homomorphism, it is not difficult to show that the globally defined map is also a homomorphism satisfying (G2).

If $G$ is not simply connected, we may apply the above procedure to the universal cover $\tilde G$ of $G$. Let $p:\tilde G\rightarrow G$ be the covering map. If it should happen that the kernel of $\Pi:\tilde G\rightarrow \operatorname{GL}(V)$ contains the kernel of $p$, then $\Pi$ descends to a representation of the original group $G$. Even if this is not the case, note that the kernel of $p$ is a discrete normal subgroup of $\tilde G$, which is therefore in the center of $\tilde G$. Thus, if $\pi$ is irreducible, Schur's lemma implies that the kernel of $p$ will act by scalar multiples of the identity. Thus, $\Pi$ descends to a projective representation of $G$, that is, one that is defined only modulo scalar multiples of the identity.

A pictorial view of how the universal covering group contains all such homotopy classes, and a technical definition of it (as a set and as a group) is given in geometric view.

For example, when this is specialized to the doubly connected SO(3, 1)^{+}, the universal covering group is $\text{SL}(2,\Complex)$, and whether its corresponding representation is faithful decides whether Π is projective.

== Classification in the compact case ==
If G is a connected compact Lie group, its finite-dimensional representations can be decomposed as direct sums of irreducible representations. The irreducibles are classified by a "theorem of the highest weight." We give a brief description of this theory here; for more details, see the articles on representation theory of a connected compact Lie group and the parallel theory classifying representations of semisimple Lie algebras.

Let T be a maximal torus in G. By Schur's lemma, the irreducible representations of T are one dimensional. These representations can be classified easily and are labeled by certain "analytically integral elements" or "weights." If $\Sigma$ is an irreducible representation of G, the restriction of $\Sigma$ to T will usually not be irreducible, but it will decompose as a direct sum of irreducible representations of T, labeled by the associated weights. (The same weight can occur more than once.) For a fixed $\Sigma$, one can identify one of the weights as "highest" and the representations are then classified by this highest weight.

An important aspect of the representation theory is the associated theory of characters. Here, for a representation $\Sigma$ of G, the character is the function

$$\chi_G:G\rightarrow\mathbb{C}$$

given by

$$\chi_G(g)=\operatorname{trace}(\Sigma(g)).$$

Two representations with the same character turn out to be isomorphic. Furthermore, the Weyl character formula gives a remarkable formula for the character of a representation in terms of its highest weight. Not only does this formula gives a lot of useful information about the representation, but it plays a crucial role in the proof of the theorem of the highest weight.

== Unitary representations on Hilbert spaces ==
Let V be a complex Hilbert space, which may be infinite dimensional, and let $U(V)$ denote the group of unitary operators on V. A unitary representation of a Lie group G on V is a group homomorphism $\Pi:G\rightarrow U(V)$ with the property that for each fixed $v\in V$, the map

$$g\mapsto \Pi(g)v$$

is a continuous map of G into V.

=== Finite-dimensional unitary representations ===
If the Hilbert space V is finite-dimensional, there is an associated representation $\pi$ of the Lie algebra $\mathfrak g$ of $G$. If $G$ is connected, then the representation $\Pi$ of $G$ is unitary if and only if $\pi(X)$ is skew-self-adjoint for each $X\in\mathfrak g$.

If $G$ is compact, then every representation $\Pi$ of $G$ on a finite-dimensional vector space V is "unitarizable," meaning that it is possible to choose an inner product on V so that each $\Pi(g),\, g\in G$ is unitary.

=== Infinite-dimensional unitary representations ===
If the Hilbert space V is allowed to be infinite dimensional, the study of unitary representations involves a number of interesting features that are not present in the finite dimensional case. For example, the construction of an appropriate representation of the Lie algebra $\mathfrak g$ becomes technically challenging. One setting in which the Lie algebra representation is well understood is that of semisimple (or reductive) Lie groups, where the associated Lie algebra representation forms a (g,K)-module.

Examples of unitary representations arise in quantum mechanics and quantum field theory, but also in Fourier analysis as shown in the following example. Let $G=\mathbb R$, and let the complex Hilbert space V be $L^2(\mathbb R)$. We define the representation $\psi:\mathbb R\rightarrow U(L^2(\mathbb R))$ by

$$[\psi(a)(f)](x)=f(x-a).$$

Here are some important examples in which unitary representations of a Lie group have been analyzed.

- The Stone–von Neumann theorem can be understood as giving a classification of the irreducible unitary representations of the Heisenberg group.
- Wigner's classification for representations of the Poincaré group plays a major conceptual role in quantum field theory by showing how the mass and spin of particles can be understood in group-theoretic terms.
- The representation theory of SL(2,R) was worked out by V. Bargmann and serves as the prototype for the study of unitary representations of noncompact semisimple Lie groups.

== Projective representations ==
In quantum physics, one is often interested in projective unitary representations of a Lie group $G$. The reason for this interest is that states of a quantum system are represented by vectors in a Hilbert space $\mathbf H$—but with the understanding that two states differing by a constant are actually the same physical state. The symmetries of the Hilbert space are then described by unitary operators, but a unitary operator that is a multiple of the identity does not change the physical state of the system. Thus, we are interested not in ordinary unitary representations—that is, homomorphisms of $G$ into the unitary group $U(\mathbf H)$—but rather in projective unitary representations—that is, homomorphisms of $G$ into the projective unitary group

$$PU(\mathbf H):=U(\mathbf H)/\{e^{i\theta}I\}.$$

To put it differently, for a projective representation, we construct a family of unitary operators $\rho(g),\,\, g\in G$, where it is understood that changing $\rho(g)$ by a constant of absolute value 1 is counted as "the same" operator. The operators $\rho(g)$ are then required to satisfy the homomorphism property up to a constant:

$$\rho(g)\rho(h)=e^{i\theta_{g,h}}\rho(gh).$$

We have already discussed the irreducible projective unitary representations of the rotation group SO(3) above; considering projective representations allows for fractional spin in addition to integer spin.

Bargmann's theorem states that for certain types of Lie groups $G$, irreducible projective unitary representations of $G$ are in one-to-one correspondence with ordinary unitary representations of the universal cover of $G$. Important examples where Bargmann's theorem applies are SO(3) (as just mentioned) and the Poincaré group. The latter case is important to Wigner's classification of the projective representations of the Poincaré group, with applications to quantum field theory.

One example where Bargmann's theorem does not apply is the group $\mathbb R^{2n}$. The set of translations in position and momentum on $L^2(\mathbb R^n)$ form a projective unitary representation of $\mathbb R^{2n}$ but they do not come from an ordinary representation of the universal cover of $\mathbb R^{2n}$—which is just $\mathbb R^{2n}$ itself. In this case, to get an ordinary representation, one has to pass to the Heisenberg group, which is a one-dimensional central extension of $\mathbb R^{2n}$. (See the discussion here.)

== The commutative case ==
If $G$ is a commutative Lie group, then every irreducible unitary representation of $G$ on complex vector spaces is one dimensional. (This claim follows from Schur's lemma and holds even if the representations are not assumed ahead of time to be finite dimensional.) Thus, the irreducible unitary representations of $G$ are simply continuous homomorphisms of $G$ into the unit circle group, U(1). For example, if $G=\mathbb R$, the irreducible unitary representations have the form

$$\Pi(x)=[e^{iax}]$$,

for some real number $a$.

See also Pontryagin duality for this case.

== See also ==
- Representation theory of connected compact groups
- Lie algebra representation
- Projective representation
- Representation theory of SU(2)
- Representation theory of the Lorentz group
- Representation theory of Hopf algebras
- Adjoint representation of a Lie group
- List of Lie group topics
- Symmetry in quantum mechanics
- Wigner D-matrix
