= Principal series representation =

In mathematics, the principal series representations of certain kinds of topological group G occur in the case where G is not a compact group. There, by analogy with spectral theory, one expects that the regular representation of G will decompose according to some kind of continuous spectrum, of representations involving a continuous parameter, as well as a discrete spectrum. The principal series representations are some induced representations constructed in a uniform way, in order to fill out the continuous part of the spectrum.

In more detail, the unitary dual is the space of all representations relevant to decomposing the regular representation. The discrete series consists of 'atoms' of the unitary dual (points carrying a Plancherel measure > 0). In the earliest examples studied, the rest (or most) of the unitary dual could be parametrised by starting with a subgroup H of G, simpler but not compact, and building up induced representations using representations of H which were accessible, in the sense of being easy to write down, and involving a parameter. (Such an induction process may produce representations that are not unitary.)

For the case of a semisimple Lie group G, the subgroup H is constructed starting from the Iwasawa decomposition

G = KAN

with K a maximal compact subgroup. Then H is chosen to contain AN (which is a non-compact solvable Lie group), being taken as

H := MAN

with M the centralizer in K of A. Representations ρ of H are considered that are irreducible, and unitary, and are the trivial representation on the subgroup N. (Assuming the case M a trivial group, such ρ are analogues of the representations of the group of diagonal matrices inside the special linear group.) The induced representations of such ρ make up the principal series. The spherical principal series consists of representations induced from 1-dimensional representations of MAN obtained by extending characters of A using the homomorphism of MAN onto A.

There may be other continuous series of representations relevant to the unitary dual: as their name implies, the principal series are the 'main' contribution.

This type of construction has been found to have application to groups G that are not Lie groups (for example, finite groups of Lie type, groups over p-adic fields).

== Examples ==
For examples, see the representation theory of SL_{2}(R). For the general linear group GL_{2} over a local field, the dimension of the Jacquet module of a principal series representation is two.
