= Projective representation =

Map from algebra to geometric transforms

In the field of representation theory in mathematics, a projective representation of a group G on a vector space V over a field F is a group homomorphism from G to the projective linear group
$$\mathrm{PGL}(V) = \mathrm{GL}(V) / F^*,$$
where GL(V) is the general linear group of invertible linear transformations of V over F, and F^{∗} is the normal subgroup of $\mathrm{GL}(V)$ consisting of nonzero scalar multiples of the identity transformation (see Scalar transformation).

Just as linear representations study the possible actions of the group G on vector spaces via linear transformation, the projective representations study the actions on lines in these vector spaces (namely (V \{0}) / F^{*}) via linear transformations.

In more concrete terms, a projective representation of $G$ can be represented as a collection of operators $\rho(g)\in\mathrm{GL}(V),\, g\in G$ satisfying the homomorphism property up to a constant:

$$\rho(g)\rho(h) = c(g, h)\rho(gh),$$

for some constant $c(g, h)\in F$. Two such choices of operators $\rho_1,\rho_2$ define the same projective representation if for any $g\in G$ the choices $\rho_1(g), \rho_2(g)$ are the same up to a scalar. Equivalently, a projective representation of $G$ is a collection of operators $\tilde\rho(g)\subset\mathrm{GL}(V), g\in G$, such that $\tilde\rho(gh)=\tilde\rho(g)\tilde\rho(h)$. Note that, in this notation, $\tilde\rho(g)$ is a set of linear operators related by multiplication with some nonzero scalar.

If it is possible to choose a particular representative $\rho(g)\in\tilde\rho(g)$ in each family of operators in such a way that the homomorphism property is satisfied exactly, rather than just up to a constant, then we say that $\tilde\rho$ can be "de-projectivized", or that $\tilde\rho$ can be "lifted to an ordinary representation". More concretely, we thus say that $\tilde\rho$ can be de-projectivized if there are $\rho(g)\in\tilde\rho(g)$ for each $g\in G$ such that $\rho(g)\rho(h)=\rho(gh)$. This possibility is discussed further below.

== Linear representations and projective representations ==
One way in which a projective representation can arise is by taking a linear group representation of G on V and applying the quotient map

$$\operatorname{GL}(V, F) \rightarrow \operatorname{PGL}(V, F)$$

which is the quotient by the subgroup F^{∗} of scalar transformations (diagonal matrices with all diagonal entries equal). The interest for algebra is in the process in the other direction: given a projective representation, try to 'lift' it to an ordinary linear representation. A general projective representation ρ: G → PGL(V) cannot be lifted to a linear representation G → GL(V), and the obstruction to this lifting can be understood via group cohomology, as described below.

However, one can lift a projective representation $\rho$ of G to a linear representation of a different group H, which will be a central extension of G. The group $H$ is the subgroup of $G\times\mathrm{GL}(V)$ defined as follows:

$$H = \{(g, A) \in G\times\mathrm{GL}(V) \mid \pi(A) = \rho(g)\}$$,

where $\pi$ is the quotient map of $\mathrm{GL}(V)$ onto $\mathrm{PGL}(V)$. Since $\rho$ is a homomorphism, it is easy to check that $H$ is, indeed, a subgroup of $G\times\mathrm{GL}(V)$. If the original projective representation $\rho$ is faithful, then $H$ is isomorphic to the preimage in $\mathrm{GL}(V)$ of $\rho(G)\subseteq\mathrm{PGL}(V)$.

We can define a homomorphism $\phi:H\rightarrow G$ by setting $\phi((g, A)) = g$. The kernel of $\phi$ is:

$$\mathrm{ker}(\phi) = \{(e, cI) \mid c \in F^*\}$$,

which is contained in the center of $H$. It is clear also that $\phi$ is surjective, so that $H$ is a central extension of $G$. We can also define an ordinary representation $\sigma$ of $H$ by setting $\sigma((g, A)) = A$. The ordinary representation $\sigma$ of $H$ is a lift of the projective representation $\rho$ of $G$ in the sense that:

$$\pi(\sigma((g, A))) = \rho(g) = \rho(\phi((g, A)))$$.

If G is a perfect group there is a single universal perfect central extension of G that can be used.

=== Group cohomology ===
The analysis of the lifting question involves group cohomology. Indeed, if one fixes for each g in G a lifted element L(g) in lifting from PGL(V) back to GL(V), the lifts then satisfy

$$L(gh) = c(g, h)L(g)L(h)$$

for some scalar c(g,h) in F^{∗}. It follows that the 2-cocycle or Schur multiplier c satisfies the cocycle equation

$$c(h, k)c(g, hk) = c(g, h) c(gh, k)$$

for all g, h, k in G. This c depends on the choice of the lift L; a different choice of lift L′(g) = f(g) L(g) will result in a different cocycle

$$c^\prime(g, h) = f(gh)f(g)^{-1} f(h)^{-1} c(g,h)$$

cohomologous to c. Thus L defines a unique class in H^{2}(G, F^{∗}). This class might not be trivial. For example, in the case of the symmetric group and alternating group, Schur established that there is exactly one non-trivial class of Schur multiplier, and completely determined all the corresponding irreducible representations.

In general, a nontrivial class leads to an extension problem for G. If G is correctly extended we obtain a linear representation of the extended group, which induces the original projective representation when pushed back down to G. The solution is always a central extension. From Schur's lemma, it follows that the irreducible representations of central extensions of G, and the irreducible projective representations of G, are essentially the same objects.

== First example: Finite abelian groups ==
=== The group with 2 elements ===
Consider first the group $G = \mathbb{Z}/2$ with two elements denoted by $e, \sigma$, where $e$ is the trivial element and the group is defined by the identity $\sigma^2 = e$. In every projective representation $e$ is sent to the identity map, so the representation is determined completely by the image of $\sigma$. This group has two (irreducible) linear representations, both 1-dimensional:

- The trivial representation: $\sigma \mapsto1$
- The nontrivial representation: $\sigma \mapsto -1$

While these are distinct as linear representations, namely their actions on the points are different, they are the same as projective representations. In a 1-dimensional space, there is a single line, and both send that line to itself. More generally, any choice of the image $\sigma \mapsto c$ will produce the same 1-dimensional projective representation. Namely, there is a unique 1-dimensional projective representation, and it is the trivial representation (and this holds for any group).

Over the 2-dimensional plane $\mathbb{R}^2$, we can send $\sigma$ to the $90^\circ$ rotation:

$$\rho:\sigma\mapsto\begin{pmatrix}0&1\\-1&0\end{pmatrix}$$

Two $90^\circ$ rotations, namely $180^\circ$ rotation, returns the lines in the plane to themselves, hence it defines a projective representation. More formally, $\rho(\sigma^2),\rho(\sigma)^2$ are the same up to a sign:

$$\rho(\sigma)^2=-Id=-\rho(e)=-\rho(\sigma^2).$$

Unlike the 1-dimensional case, this projective representation doesn't arise from a standard linear representation. However, working over the complex numbers $\mathbb{C}$ instead of the real numbers, this projective representation is the same as

$$\rho':\sigma\mapsto i\cdot\begin{pmatrix}0&1\\-1&0\end{pmatrix},$$
in which case it is a linear representation, since $\rho'(\sigma)^2 = \rho'(\sigma^2) = Id$.

=== General cyclic group ===
Now let $G=\mathbb{Z} / n$ which we write multiplicatively as $G=\{e,\sigma,\sigma^2,...,\sigma^{n-1}\}$, and let $\rho:G \to GL(V)$ be a choice of representatives for a projective representation:

- The trivial element: Since $\rho(e)\rho(e) = c(e,e) \rho(e^2) = c(e,e) \rho(e)$, and $\rho(e)$ is invertible, it must be the scalar $\rho(e)=c(e,e)\cdot Id$. Hence, we can change the choice to be $\rho(e)=Id$ without changing the representation.
- The nontrivial elements: Since $\rho(\sigma)^k,\rho(\sigma^k)$ are the same up to a scalar, we can similarly choose the representatives so that $\rho(\sigma^k)=\rho(\sigma)^k$ for $k=0,...,n-1$.

After these reductions, we are left with a choice for $\rho(\sigma)$ and a scalar $c$ such that

$$\rho(\sigma)^n=c\cdot\rho(\sigma^n)=c\cdot\rho(e)=c\cdot Id .$$

On the other hand, any choice of a root $A^n = c\cdot Id$ for some scalar $c \neq 0$ can define a projective representation by setting
$$\rho(\sigma^k)=A^k,\;k=0,...,n-1 .$$

Over the complex numbers (or generally over algebraically closed field), changing the choice of $\rho(\sigma)$ into $\frac{1}{\sqrt[n]{c}} \rho(\sigma)$ will produce a standard linear representation, or in other words all the projective representations arise from ordinary linear representations

=== Product of cyclic groups ===
In a product of two cyclic groups $G = \{e,\sigma,...\sigma^{n-1}\}\times \{e,\tau,...,\tau^{m-1}\}$, a similar process can be done by changing the choice of representatives to satisfy:

$$\rho(\sigma^k\cdot \tau^\ell) := \rho(\sigma)^k \rho(\tau)^\ell,\; \; 0\leq k < n, \;0\leq \ell < m .$$

This reduces to three conditions:

1. $\rho(\sigma)^n = c_\sigma \cdot Id$ , $\rho(\tau)^m = c_\tau \cdot Id$, and
2. $\rho(\tau)\rho(\sigma) = c_{\tau,\sigma} \rho(\sigma \tau) = c_{\tau,\sigma} \rho(\sigma) \rho(\tau)$.

This new scalar must satisfy:

- $c_\tau\rho(\sigma)=\rho(\tau)^m\rho(\sigma)=c_{\tau,\sigma}^m \rho(\sigma) \rho(\tau)^m=c_\tau c_{\tau,\sigma}^m \rho(\sigma)$, so that $c_{\tau, \sigma}^m = 1$.
- Similarly, $c_{\tau,\sigma}^n = 1$.

Both together imply that $c_{\tau,\sigma}^{\text{gcd}(n,m)} = 1$. Any such choices of $\rho(\sigma), \rho(\tau)$ which satisfy these 3 conditions will define a projective representation.

Over the complex numbers, as previously we can assume that $c_\tau = c_\sigma = 1$, so the only parameter is $c_{\tau,\sigma}^{\text{gcd}(n,m)} = 1$.

For example, taking $n=m$ we have 3 conditions $\rho(\sigma)^n=\rho(\tau)^n=Id$ and $\rho(\tau)\rho(\sigma) = c_{\tau,\sigma}\rho(\sigma)\rho(\tau)$ where $c_{\tau,\sigma}^n = 1$. These equations have solutions in $GL_n(\mathbb{C})$ for any $n$ and any choice of root of unity $c_{\tau,\sigma}^n = 1$. More specifically, letting $\zeta_n$ be such a root of unity, define:

$$\rho(\sigma) \mapsto
\begin{pmatrix}
1 & 0 & 0 & \cdots & 0 \\
0 & \zeta_n & 0 &   & \vdots \\
0 & 0 & \zeta_n^2 &   &   \\
\vdots &  &  & \ddots & 0 \\
0 &  \cdots &   & 0 & \zeta_n^{n-1}
\end{pmatrix}
\;\;;\;\;
\rho(\tau)  \mapsto
\begin{pmatrix}
0 & 1 & 0 &  &  \\
& 0 & 1 & \ddots&  \\
\vdots  &   & 0 & \ddots  & 0 \\
0 &  &  & \ddots & 1 \\
1 & 0  &  \cdots &  & 0
\end{pmatrix}$$.

Both matrices define an "$n$-rotation": $\rho(\sigma)$ rotates each coordinate separately as complex numbers, while $\rho(\tau)$ rotates the coordinates of the vector, and in particular $\rho(\sigma)^n=\rho(\tau)^n=Id$. In addition we have that $\rho(\tau)\rho(\sigma)=\zeta_n \rho(\sigma)\rho(\tau)$.

Note that $c_{\tau,\sigma}=\rho(\tau)\rho(\sigma)\rho(\tau)^{-1}\rho(\sigma)^{-1}$ is independent of the choices of representatives. It follows that the $n$ projective representations defined above for the $n$ distinct roots of unity are distinct representations.

The projective representations for general product of cyclic groups is done in a similar manner.

== Discrete Fourier transform ==
The projective representations of $\mathbb{Z}/p \times \mathbb{Z} /p$ as mentioned above, are many times viewed through the lens of Fourier transform.

Consider the field $\mathbb Z/p$ of integers mod $p$, where $p$ is prime, and let $V$ be the $p$-dimensional space of functions on $\mathbb Z/p$ with values in $\mathbb C$. For each $a$ in $\mathbb Z/p$, define two operators, $T_a$ and $S_a$ on $V$ as follows:

$$\begin{align}
(T_a f)(b) &= f(b - a) \\
(S_a f)(b) &= e^{2\pi iab/p}f(b).
\end{align}$$

We write the formula for $S_a$ as if $a$ and $b$ were integers, but it is easily seen that the result only depends on the value of $a$ and $b$ mod $p$. The operator $T_a$ is a translation, while $S_a$ is a shift in frequency space (that is, it has the effect of translating the discrete Fourier transform of $f$).

One may easily verify that for any $a$ and $b$ in $\mathbb Z/p$, the operators $T_a$ and $S_b$ commute up to multiplication by a constant:

$$T_a S_b = e^{-2\pi iab/p}S_b T_a$$.

We may therefore define a projective representation $\rho$ of $\mathbb Z/p\times \mathbb Z/p$ as follows:

$$\rho(a, b) = [T_a S_b]$$,

where $[A]$ denotes the image of an operator $A\in\mathrm{GL}(V)$ in the quotient group $\mathrm{PGL}(V)$. Since $T_a$ and $S_b$ commute up to a constant, $\rho$ is easily seen to be a projective representation. On the other hand, since $T_a$ and $S_b$ do not actually commute—and no nonzero multiples of them will commute—$\rho$ cannot be lifted to an ordinary (linear) representation of $\mathbb Z/p\times \mathbb Z/p$.

Since the projective representation $\rho$ is faithful, the central extension $H$ of $\mathbb Z/p\times \mathbb Z/p$ obtained by the construction in the previous section is just the preimage in $\mathrm{GL}(V)$ of the image of $\rho$. Explicitly, this means that $H$ is the group of all operators of the form

$$e^{2\pi ic/p}T_a S_b$$

for $a,b,c\in\mathbb Z/p$. This group is a discrete version of the Heisenberg group and is isomorphic to the group of matrices of the form

$$\begin{pmatrix}
1 & a & c\\
0 & 1 & b\\
0 & 0 & 1\\
\end{pmatrix}$$

with $a, b, c\in\mathbb Z/p$.

== Projective representations of Lie groups ==
Studying projective representations of Lie groups leads one to consider true representations of their central extensions (see Group extension § Lie groups). In many cases of interest it suffices to consider representations of covering groups. Specifically, suppose $\hat G$ is a connected cover of a connected Lie group $G$, so that $G\cong \hat G/N$ for a discrete central subgroup $N$ of $\hat G$. (Note that $\hat G$ is a special sort of central extension of $G$.) Suppose also that $\Pi$ is an irreducible unitary representation of $\hat G$ (possibly infinite dimensional). Then by Schur's lemma, the central subgroup $N$ will act by scalar multiples of the identity. Thus, at the projective level, $\Pi$ will descend to $G$. That is to say, for each $g\in G$, we can choose a preimage $\hat g$ of $g$ in $\hat G$, and define a projective representation $\rho$ of $G$ by setting

$$\rho(g) = \left[\Pi\left(\hat g\right)\right]$$,

where $[A]$ denotes the image in $\mathrm{PGL}(V)$ of an operator $A\in\mathrm{GL}(V)$. Since $N$ is contained in the center of $\hat G$ and the center of $\hat G$ acts as scalars, the value of $\left[\Pi\left(\hat g\right)\right]$ does not depend on the choice of $\hat g$.

The preceding construction is an important source of examples of projective representations. Bargmann's theorem (discussed below) gives a criterion under which every irreducible projective unitary representation of $G$ arises in this way.

=== Projective representations of SO(3) ===
A physically important example of the above construction comes from the case of the rotation group SO(3), whose universal cover is SU(2). According to the representation theory of SU(2), there is exactly one irreducible representation of SU(2) in each dimension. When the dimension is odd (the "integer spin" case), the representation descends to an ordinary representation of SO(3). When the dimension is even (the "fractional spin" case), the representation does not descend to an ordinary representation of SO(3) but does (by the result discussed above) descend to a projective representation of SO(3). Such projective representations of SO(3) (the ones that do not come from ordinary representations) are referred to as "spinorial representations", whose elements (vectors) are called spinors.

By an argument discussed below, every finite-dimensional, irreducible projective representation of SO(3) comes from a finite-dimensional, irreducible ordinary representation of SU(2).

=== Examples of covers, leading to projective representations ===
Notable cases of covering groups giving interesting projective representations:

- The special orthogonal group SO(n, F) is doubly covered by the Spin group Spin(n, F).
- In particular, the group SO(3) (the rotation group in 3 dimensions) is doubly covered by SU(2). This has important applications in quantum mechanics, as the study of representations of SU(2) leads to a nonrelativistic (low-velocity) theory of spin.
- The group SO^{+}(3;1), isomorphic to the Möbius group, is likewise doubly covered by SL_{2}(C). Both are supergroups of aforementioned SO(3) and SU(2) respectively and form a relativistic spin theory.
- The universal cover of the Poincaré group is a double cover (the semidirect product of SL_{2}(C) with R^{4}). The irreducible unitary representations of this cover give rise to projective representations of the Poincaré group, as in Wigner's classification. Passing to the cover is essential, in order to include the fractional spin case.
- The orthogonal group O(n) is double covered by the Pin group Pin_{±}(n).
- The symplectic group Sp(2n)=Sp(2n, R) (not to be confused with the compact real form of the symplectic group, sometimes also denoted by Sp(m)) is double covered by the metaplectic group Mp(2n). An important projective representation of Sp(2n) comes from the metaplectic representation of Mp(2n).

=== Finite-dimensional projective unitary representations ===
In quantum physics, symmetry of a physical system is typically implemented by means of a projective unitary representation $\rho$ of a Lie group $G$ on the quantum Hilbert space, that is, a continuous homomorphism

$$\rho: G\rightarrow\mathrm{PU}(\mathcal H),$$

where $\mathrm{PU}(\mathcal H)$ is the quotient of the unitary group $\mathrm{U}(\mathcal H)$ by the operators of the form $cI,\,|c| = 1$. The reason for taking the quotient is that physically, two vectors in the Hilbert space that are proportional represent the same physical state. [That is to say, the space of (pure) states is the set of equivalence classes of unit vectors, where two unit vectors are considered equivalent if they are proportional.] Thus, a unitary operator that is a multiple of the identity actually acts as the identity on the level of physical states.

A finite-dimensional projective representation of $G$ then gives rise to a projective unitary representation $\rho_*$ of the Lie algebra $\mathfrak g$ of $G$. In the finite-dimensional case, it is always possible to "de-projectivize" the Lie-algebra representation $\rho_*$ simply by choosing a representative for each $\rho_*(X)$ having trace zero. In light of the homomorphisms theorem, it is then possible to de-projectivize $\rho$ itself, but at the expense of passing to the universal cover $\tilde G$ of $G$. That is to say, every finite-dimensional projective unitary representation of $G$ arises from an ordinary unitary representation of $\tilde G$ by the procedure mentioned at the beginning of this section.

Specifically, since the Lie-algebra representation was de-projectivized by choosing a trace-zero representative, every finite-dimensional projective unitary representation of $G$ arises from a determinant-one ordinary unitary representation of $\tilde G$ (i.e., one in which each element of $\tilde G$ acts as an operator with determinant one). If $\mathfrak g$ is semisimple, then every element of $\mathfrak g$ is a linear combination of commutators, in which case every representation of $\mathfrak g$ is by operators with trace zero. In the semisimple case, then, the associated linear representation of $\tilde G$ is unique.

Conversely, if $\rho$ is an irreducible unitary representation of the universal cover $\tilde G$ of $G$, then by Schur's lemma, the center of $\tilde G$ acts as scalar multiples of the identity. Thus, at the projective level, $\rho$ descends to a projective representation of the original group $G$. Thus, there is a natural one-to-one correspondence between the irreducible projective representations of $G$ and the irreducible, determinant-one ordinary representations of $\tilde G$. (In the semisimple case, the qualifier "determinant-one" may be omitted, because in that case, every representation of $\tilde G$ is automatically determinant one.)

An important example is the case of SO(3), whose universal cover is SU(2). Now, the Lie algebra $\mathrm{su}(2)$ is semisimple. Furthermore, since SU(2) is a compact group, every finite-dimensional representation of it admits an inner product with respect to which the representation is unitary. Thus, the irreducible projective representations of SO(3) are in one-to-one correspondence with the irreducible ordinary representations of SU(2).

=== Infinite-dimensional projective unitary representations: the Heisenberg case ===
The results of the previous subsection do not hold in the infinite-dimensional case, simply because the trace of $\rho_*(X)$ is typically not well defined. Indeed, the result fails: Consider, for example, the translations in position space and in momentum space for a quantum particle moving in $\mathbb R^n$, acting on the Hilbert space $L^2(\mathbb R^n)$. These operators are defined as follows:

$$\begin{align}
(T_a f)(x) &= f(x - a) \\
(S_a f)(x) &= e^{iax}f(x),
\end{align}$$

for all $a\in\mathbb R^n$. These operators are simply continuous versions of the operators $T_a$ and $S_a$ described in the "First example" section above. As in that section, we can then define a projective unitary representation $\rho$ of $\mathbb R^{2n}$:

$$\rho(a, b) = [T_a S_b],$$

because the operators commute up to a phase factor. But no choice of the phase factors will lead to an ordinary unitary representation, since translations in position do not commute with translations in momentum (and multiplying by a nonzero constant will not change this). These operators do, however, come from an ordinary unitary representation of the Heisenberg group, which is a one-dimensional central extension of $\mathbb R^{2n}$. (See also the Stone–von Neumann theorem.)

=== Infinite-dimensional projective unitary representations: Bargmann's theorem ===
On the other hand, Bargmann's theorem states that if the second Lie algebra cohomology group $H^2(\mathfrak g; \mathbb R)$ of $\mathfrak g$ is trivial, then every projective unitary representation of $G$ can be de-projectivized after passing to the universal cover. More precisely, suppose we begin with a projective unitary representation $\rho$ of a Lie group $G$. Then the theorem states that $\rho$ can be lifted to an ordinary unitary representation $\hat\rho$ of the universal cover $\hat G$ of $G$. This means that $\hat\rho$ maps each element of the kernel of the covering map to a scalar multiple of the identity—so that at the projective level, $\hat\rho$ descends to $G$—and that the associated projective representation of $G$ is equal to $\rho$.

The theorem does not apply to the group $\mathbb R^{2n}$—as the previous example shows—because the second cohomology group of the associated commutative Lie algebra is nontrivial. Examples where the result does apply include semisimple groups (e.g., SL(2,R)) and the Poincaré group. This last result is important for Wigner's classification of the projective unitary representations of the Poincaré group.

The proof of Bargmann's theorem goes by considering a central extension $H$ of $G$, constructed similarly to the section above on linear representations and projective representations, as a subgroup of the direct product group $G\times U(\mathcal H)$, where $\mathcal H$ is the Hilbert space on which $\rho$ acts and $U(\mathcal H)$ is the group of unitary operators on $\mathcal H$. The group $H$ is defined as

$$H = \{(g, U) \mid \pi(U) = \rho(g)\}.$$

As in the earlier section, the map $\phi: H \rightarrow G$ given by $\phi(g, U) = g$ is a surjective homomorphism whose kernel is $\{(e, cI) \mid |c| = 1\},$ so that $H$ is a central extension of $G$. Again as in the earlier section, we can then define a linear representation $\sigma$ of $H$ by setting $\sigma(g, U) = U$. Then $\sigma$ is a lift of $\rho$ in the sense that $\rho\circ\phi = \pi\circ\sigma$, where $\pi$ is the quotient map from $U(\mathcal H)$ to $PU(\mathcal H)$.

A key technical point is to show that $H$ is a Lie group. (This claim is not so obvious, because if $\mathcal H$ is infinite dimensional, the group $G\times U(\mathcal H)$ is an infinite-dimensional topological group.) Once this result is established, we see that $H$ is a one-dimensional Lie group central extension of $G$, so that the Lie algebra $\mathfrak h$ of $H$ is also a one-dimensional central extension of $\mathfrak g$ (note here that the adjective "one-dimensional" does not refer to $H$ and $\mathfrak{h}$, but rather to the kernel of the projection map from those objects onto $G$ and $\mathfrak{g}$ respectively). But the cohomology group $H^2(\mathfrak g; \mathbb R)$ may be identified with the space of one-dimensional (again, in the aforementioned sense) central extensions of $\mathfrak g$; if $H^2(\mathfrak g; \mathbb R)$ is trivial then every one-dimensional central extension of $\mathfrak g$ is trivial. In that case, $\mathfrak h$ is just the direct sum of $\mathfrak g$ with a copy of the real line. It follows that the universal cover $\tilde H$ of $H$ must be just a direct product of the universal cover of $G$ with a copy of the real line. We can then lift $\sigma$ from $H$ to $\tilde H$ (by composing with the covering map) and finally restrict this lift to the universal cover $\tilde G$ of $G$.

== See also ==
- Affine representation
- Group action
- Central extension
- Particle physics and representation theory
- Spin-1/2
- Spinor
- Symmetry in quantum mechanics
- Heisenberg group
