= (g,K)-module =

In mathematics, more specifically in the representation theory of reductive Lie groups, a $(\mathfrak{g},K)$-module is an algebraic object, first introduced by Harish-Chandra, used to deal with continuous infinite-dimensional representations using algebraic techniques. Harish-Chandra showed that the study of irreducible unitary representations of a real reductive Lie group, G, could be reduced to the study of irreducible $(\mathfrak{g},K)$-modules, where $\mathfrak{g}$ is the Lie algebra of G and K is a maximal compact subgroup of G.

== Definition ==
Let G be a real Lie group. Let $\mathfrak{g}$ be its Lie algebra, and K a maximal compact subgroup with Lie algebra $\mathfrak{k}$. A $(\mathfrak{g},K)$-module is defined as follows: it is a vector space V that is both a Lie algebra representation of $\mathfrak{g}$ and a group representation of K (without regard to the topology of K) satisfying the following three conditions

1. for any v ∈ V, k ∈ K, and X ∈ $\mathfrak{g}$

$$k\cdot (X\cdot v)=(\operatorname{Ad}(k)X)\cdot (k\cdot v)$$

2. for any v ∈ V, Kv spans a finite-dimensional subspace of V on which the action of K is continuous
3. for any v ∈ V and Y ∈ $\mathfrak{k}$

$$\left.\left(\frac{d}{dt}\exp(tY)\cdot v\right)\right|_{t=0}=Y\cdot v.$$

In the above, the dot, $\cdot$, denotes both the action of $\mathfrak{g}$ on V and that of K. The notation Ad(k) denotes the adjoint action of G on $\mathfrak{g}$, and Kv is the set of vectors $k\cdot v$ as k varies over all of K.

The first condition can be understood as follows: if G is the general linear group GL(n, R), then $\mathfrak{g}$ is the algebra of all n by n matrices, and the adjoint action of k on X is kXk^{−1}; condition 1 can then be read as

$$kXv=kXk^{-1}kv=\left(kXk^{-1}\right)kv.$$

In other words, it is a compatibility requirement among the actions of K on V, $\mathfrak{g}$ on V, and K on $\mathfrak{g}$. The third condition is also a compatibility condition, this time between the action of $\mathfrak{k}$ on V viewed as a sub-Lie algebra of $\mathfrak{g}$ and its action viewed as the differential of the action of K on V.
