= Representation theory of SU(2) =

First case of a Lie group that is both compact and non-abelian

In the study of the representation theory of Lie groups, the study of representations of SU(2) is fundamental to the study of representations of semisimple Lie groups. It is the first case of a Lie group that is both a compact group and a non-abelian group. The first condition implies the representation theory is discrete: representations are direct sums of a collection of basic irreducible representations (governed by the Peter–Weyl theorem). The second means that there will be irreducible representations in dimensions greater than 1.

SU(2) is the universal covering group of SO(3), and so its representation theory includes that of the latter, by dint of a surjective homomorphism to it. This underlies the significance of SU(2) for the description of non-relativistic spin in theoretical physics; see below for other physical and historical context.

As shown below, the finite-dimensional irreducible representations of SU(2) are indexed by a non-negative integer $m$ and have dimension $m + 1$. In the physics literature, the representations are labeled by the quantity $l = m/2$, where $l$ is then either an integer or a half-integer, and the dimension is $2l + 1$.

== Lie algebra representations ==
The representations of the group are found by considering representations of $\mathfrak{su}(2)$, the Lie algebra of SU(2). Since the group SU(2) is simply connected, every representation of its Lie algebra can be integrated to a group representation; we will give an explicit construction of the representations at the group level below.

=== Real and complexified Lie algebras ===
The real Lie algebra $\mathfrak{su}(2)$ has a basis given by

$$u_1 = \begin{bmatrix}
0 & i\\
i & 0
\end{bmatrix} ,\qquad
u_2 = \begin{bmatrix}
0 & -1\\
1 &  ~~0
\end{bmatrix} ,\qquad
u_3 = \begin{bmatrix}
i &  ~~0\\
0 & -i
\end{bmatrix}~,$$

(These basis matrices are related to the Pauli matrices by $u_1 = +i\ \sigma_1 \;, \, u_2 = -i\ \sigma_2 \;,$ and $u_3 = +i\ \sigma_3 ~.$)

The matrices are a representation of the quaternions:

$$u_1\,u_1 = -I\, , ~~\quad u_2\,u_2 = -I \, , ~~\quad u_3\,u_3 = -I\, ,$$
$$u_1\,u_2 = +u_3\, , \quad u_2\,u_3 = +u_1\, , \quad u_3\,u_1 = +u_2\, ,$$
$$u_2\,u_1 = -u_3\, , \quad u_3\,u_2 = -u_1\, , \quad u_1\,u_3 = -u_2 ~.$$

where I is the conventional 2×2 identity matrix:
$$~~I = \begin{bmatrix}
1 & 0\\
0 & 1
\end{bmatrix} ~.$$

Consequently, the commutator brackets of the matrices satisfy

$$[u_1, u_2] = 2 u_3\, ,\quad [u_2, u_3] = 2 u_1\, ,\quad [u_3, u_1] = 2 u_2 ~.$$

It is then convenient to pass to the complexified Lie algebra

$$\mathfrak{su}(2) + i\,\mathfrak{su}(2) = \mathfrak{sl}(2;\mathbb C) ~.$$

(Skew self-adjoint matrices with trace zero plus self-adjoint matrices with trace zero gives all matrices with trace zero.) As long as we are working with representations over $\mathbb C$ this passage from real to complexified Lie algebra is harmless. The reason for passing to the complexification is that it allows us to construct a nice basis of a type that does not exist in the real Lie algebra $\mathfrak{su}(2)$.

The complexified Lie algebra is spanned by three elements $X$, $Y$, and $H$, given by

$$H = \frac{1}{i}u_3, \qquad
X = \frac{1}{2i}\left(u_1 - iu_2\right), \qquad
Y = \frac{1}{2i}(u_1 + iu_2) ~;$$

or, explicitly,

$$H = \begin{bmatrix}
1 & ~~0\\
0 & -1
\end{bmatrix}, \qquad
X = \begin{bmatrix}
0 & 1\\
0 & 0
\end{bmatrix}, \qquad
Y = \begin{bmatrix}
0 & 0\\
1 & 0
\end{bmatrix}
~.$$

The non-trivial/non-identical part of the group's multiplication table is

$$H X ~=~~~~X ,\qquad H Y ~=   -Y ,\qquad X Y ~=~ \tfrac{1}{2}\left(I + H \right),$$
$$X H ~=   -X ,\qquad Y H ~=~~~~Y ,\qquad Y X ~=~ \tfrac{1}{2}\left(I - H \right),$$
$$H H ~=~~~I~ ,\qquad X X ~=~~~~O ,\qquad Y Y ~=~ ~O,$$

where O is the 2×2 all-zero matrix. Hence their commutation relations are

$$[H, X] = 2 X, \qquad [H, Y] = -2 Y, \qquad [X, Y] = H.$$

Up to a factor of 2, the elements $H$, $X$ and $Y$ may be identified with the angular momentum operators $J_z$, $J_+$, and $J_-$, respectively. The factor of 2 is a discrepancy between conventions in math and physics; we will attempt to mention both conventions in the results that follow.

=== Weights and the structure of the representation ===
In this setting, the eigenvalues for $H$ are referred to as the weights of the representation. The following elementary result is a key step in the analysis. Suppose that $v$ is an eigenvector for $H$ with eigenvalue $\alpha$; that is, that $H v = \alpha v.$ Then

$$\begin{alignat}{5}
H (X v) &= (X H + [H,X]) v &&= (\alpha + 2) X v,\\[3pt]
H (Y v) &= (Y H + [H,Y]) v &&= (\alpha - 2) Y v.
\end{alignat}$$

In other words, $Xv$ is either the zero vector or an eigenvector for $H$ with eigenvalue $\alpha + 2$ and $Y v$ is either zero or an eigenvector for $H$ with eigenvalue $\alpha - 2.$ Thus, the operator $X$ acts as a raising operator, increasing the weight by 2, while $Y$ acts as a lowering operator.

Suppose now that $V$ is an irreducible, finite-dimensional representation of the complexified Lie algebra. Then $H$ can have only finitely many eigenvalues. In particular, there must be some final eigenvalue $\lambda \in \mathbb{C}$ with the property that $\lambda + 2$ is not an eigenvalue. Let $v_0$ be an eigenvector for $H$ with that eigenvalue $\lambda:$

$$H v_0 = \lambda v_0,$$

then we must have

$$X v_0 = 0,$$

or else the above identity would tell us that $X v_0$ is an eigenvector with eigenvalue $\lambda + 2 .$

Now define a "chain" of vectors $v_0, v_1, \ldots$ by

$$v_k = Y^k  v_0$$.

A simple argument by induction then shows that

$$X  v_k = k(\lambda - (k - 1))v_{k-1}$$

for all $k = 1, 2, \ldots .$ Now, if $v_k$ is not the zero vector, it is an eigenvector for $H$ with eigenvalue $\lambda - 2k .$ Since, again, $H$ has only finitely many eigenvectors, we conclude that $v_\ell$ must be zero for some $\ell$ (and then $v_k = 0$ for all $k > \ell$).

Let $v_m$ be the last nonzero vector in the chain; that is, $v_m \neq 0$ but $v_{m+1} = 0 .$ Then of course $X v_{m+1} = 0$ and by the above identity with $k = m + 1 ,$ we have

$$0 = X  v_{m+1} = (m + 1)(\lambda - m)v_m .$$

Since $m + 1$ is at least one and $v_m \neq 0 ,$ we conclude that $\lambda$ must be equal to the non-negative integer $m .$

We thus obtain a chain of $m + 1$ vectors, $v_0, v_1, \ldots, v_m ,$ such that $Y$ acts as

$$Y  v_m = 0, \quad Y  v_k = v_{k+1} \quad (k < m)$$

and $X$ acts as

$$X  v_0 = 0, \quad X  v_k = k  (m - (k - 1))  v_{k-1} \quad (k \ge 1)$$

and $H$ acts as

$$H  v_k = (m - 2k)  v_k .$$

(We have replaced $\lambda$ with its currently known value of $m$ in the formulas above.)

Since the vectors $v_k$ are eigenvectors for $H$ with distinct eigenvalues, they must be linearly independent. Furthermore, the span of $v_0, \ldots , v_m$ is clearly invariant under the action of the complexified Lie algebra. Since $V$ is assumed irreducible, this span must be all of $V .$ We thus obtain a complete description of what an irreducible representation must look like; that is, a basis for the space and a complete description of how the generators of the Lie algebra act. Conversely, for any $m \geq 0$ we can construct a representation by simply using the above formulas and checking that the commutation relations hold. This representation can then be shown to be irreducible.

Conclusion: For each non-negative integer $m ,$ there is a unique irreducible representation with highest weight $m .$ Each irreducible representation is equivalent to one of these. The representation with highest weight $m$ has dimension $m + 1$ with weights $m, m - 2, \ldots, -(m - 2), -m ,$ each having multiplicity one.

=== The Casimir element ===
We now introduce the (quadratic) Casimir element, $C$ given by

$$C = -\left(u_1^2 + u_2^2 + u_3^2\right)$$.

We can view $C$ as an element of the universal enveloping algebra or as an operator in each irreducible representation. Viewing $C$ as an operator on the representation with highest weight $m$, we may easily compute that $C$ commutes with each $u_i .$ Thus, by Schur's lemma, $C$ acts as a scalar multiple $c_m$ of the identity for each $m .$ We can write $C$ in terms of the $\{ H, X, Y \}$ basis as follows:

$$C = (X + Y)^2 - (-X + Y)^2 + H^2  ,$$

which can be reduced to

$$C = 4YX + H^2 + 2H .$$

The eigenvalue of $C$ in the representation with highest weight $m$ can be computed by applying $C$ to the highest weight vector, which is annihilated by $X ;$ thus, we get

$$c_m = m^2 + 2m = m(m + 2) .$$

In the physics literature, the Casimir is normalized as $C' = \frac{1}{4}C .$ Labeling things in terms of $\ell = \frac{1}{2}m ,$ the eigenvalue $d_\ell$ of $C'$ is then computed as

$$d_\ell = \frac{1}{4}(2\ell)(2\ell + 2) = \ell (\ell + 1) .$$

== The group representations ==
=== Action on polynomials ===
Since SU(2) is simply connected, a general result shows that every representation of its (complexified) Lie algebra gives rise to a representation of SU(2) itself. It is desirable, however, to give an explicit realization of the representations at the group level. The group representations can be realized on spaces of polynomials in two complex variables. That is, for each non-negative integer $m$, we let $V_m$ denote the space of homogeneous polynomials $p$ of degree $m$ in two complex variables. Then the dimension of $V_m$ is $m + 1$. There is a natural action of SU(2) on each $V_m$, given by

$$[U \cdot p](z) = p\left(U^{-1}z\right),\quad z\in\mathbb C^2, U\in\mathrm{SU}(2)$$.

The associated Lie algebra representation is simply the one described in the previous section. (See here for an explicit formula for the action of the Lie algebra on the space of polynomials.)

=== The characters ===
The character of a representation $\Pi: G \rightarrow \operatorname{GL}(V)$ is the function $\Chi: G \rightarrow \mathbb{C}$ given by

$$\Chi(g) = \operatorname{trace}(\Pi(g))$$.

Characters plays an important role in the representation theory of compact groups. The character is easily seen to be a class function, that is, invariant under conjugation.

In the SU(2) case, the fact that the character is a class function means it is determined by its value on the maximal torus $T$ consisting of the diagonal matrices in SU(2), since the elements are orthogonally diagonalizable with the spectral theorem. Since the irreducible representation with highest weight $m$ has weights $m, m - 2, \ldots, -(m - 2), -m$, it is easy to see that the associated character satisfies

$$\Chi\left(\begin{pmatrix}
e^{i\theta} & 0\\
0 & e^{-i\theta}
\end{pmatrix}\right) = e^{im\theta} + e^{i(m-2)\theta} + \cdots + e^{-i(m-2)\theta} + e^{-im\theta}.$$

This expression is a finite geometric series that can be simplified to

$$\Chi\left(\begin{pmatrix}
e^{i\theta} & 0\\
0 & e^{-i\theta}
\end{pmatrix}\right) = \frac{\sin((m + 1)\theta)}{\sin(\theta)}.$$

This last expression is just the statement of the Weyl character formula for the SU(2) case.

Actually, following Weyl's original analysis of the representation theory of compact groups, one can classify the representations entirely from the group perspective, without using Lie algebra representations at all. In this approach, the Weyl character formula plays an essential part in the classification, along with the Peter–Weyl theorem. The SU(2) case of this story is described here.

=== Relation to the representations of SO(3) ===
Note that either all of the weights of the representation are even (if $m$ is even) or all of the weights are odd (if $m$ is odd). In physical terms, this distinction is important: The representations with even weights correspond to ordinary representations of the rotation group SO(3). By contrast, the representations with odd weights correspond to double-valued (spinorial) representation of SO(3), also known as projective representations.

In the physics conventions, $m$ being even corresponds to $l$ being an integer while $m$ being odd corresponds to $l$ being a half-integer. These two cases are described as integer spin and half-integer spin, respectively. The representations with odd, positive values of $m$ are faithful representations of SU(2), while the representations of SU(2) with non-negative, even $m$ are not faithful.

== Another approach ==
See under the example for Borel–Weil–Bott theorem.

== Most important irreducible representations and their applications ==
Representations of SU(2) describe non-relativistic spin, due to being a double covering of the rotation group of Euclidean 3-space. Relativistic spin is described by the representation theory of SL_{2}(C), a supergroup of SU(2), which in a similar way covers SO^{+}(1;3), the relativistic version of the rotation group. SU(2) symmetry also supports concepts of isobaric spin and weak isospin, collectively known as isospin.

The representation with $m = 1$ (i.e., $l = 1/2$ in the physics convention) is the 2 representation, the fundamental representation of SU(2). When an element of SU(2) is written as a complex 2 × 2 matrix, it is simply a multiplication of column 2-vectors. It is known in physics as the spin-1/2 and, historically, as the multiplication of quaternions (more precisely, multiplication by a unit quaternion). This representation can also be viewed as a double-valued projective representation of the rotation group SO(3).

The representation with $m = 2$ (i.e., $l = 1$) is the 3 representation, the adjoint representation. It describes 3-d rotations, the standard representation of SO(3), so real numbers are sufficient for it. Physicists use it for the description of massive spin-1 particles, such as vector mesons, but its importance for spin theory is much higher because it anchors spin states to the geometry of the physical 3-space. This representation emerged simultaneously with the 2 when William Rowan Hamilton introduced versors, his term for elements of SU(2). Note that Hamilton did not use standard group theory terminology since his work preceded Lie group developments.

The $m = 3$ (i.e. $l = 3/2$) representation is used in particle physics for certain baryons, such as the Δ.

== See also ==
- Rotation operator (vector space)
- Rotation operator (quantum mechanics)
- Representation theory of SO(3)
- Connection between SO(3) and SU(2)
- Representation theory of SL_{2}(R)
- Electroweak interaction
- Rotation group SO(3) § A note on Lie algebras
