= Representation theory of SL2(R) =

Unitary representations of a Lie group

In mathematics, the main results concerning irreducible unitary representations of the Lie group SL(2, R) are due to Gelfand and Naimark (1946), V. Bargmann (1947), and Harish-Chandra (1952).

== Structure of the complexified Lie algebra ==
We choose a basis H, X, Y for the complexification of the Lie algebra of SL(2, R) so that iH generates the Lie algebra of a compact Cartan subgroup K (so in particular unitary representations split as a sum of eigenspaces of H), and {H, X, Y} is an sl_{2}-triple, which means that they satisfy the relations

$$[H,X]=2X, \quad [H,Y]=-2Y, \quad [X,Y]=H.$$

One way of doing this is as follows:

$$H=\begin{pmatrix}0 & -i\\ i & 0\end{pmatrix}$$
corresponding to the subgroup K of matrices
$$\begin{pmatrix}\cos(\theta) & -\sin(\theta)\\ \sin(\theta)& \cos(\theta)\end{pmatrix}$$
$$X={1\over 2}\begin{pmatrix}1 & i\\ i & -1\end{pmatrix}$$
$$Y={1\over 2}\begin{pmatrix}1 & -i\\ -i & -1\end{pmatrix}$$

The Casimir operator Ω is defined to be

$$\Omega= H^2+1+2XY+2YX.$$

It generates the center of the universal enveloping algebra of the complexified Lie algebra of SL(2, R). The Casimir element acts on any irreducible representation as multiplication by some complex scalar μ^{2}. Thus in the case of the Lie algebra sl_{2}, the infinitesimal character of an irreducible representation is specified by one complex number.

The center Z of the group SL(2, R) is a cyclic group {I, −I} of order 2, consisting of the identity matrix and its negative. On any irreducible representation, the center either acts trivially, or by the nontrivial character of Z, which represents the matrix -I by multiplication by -1 in the representation space. Correspondingly, one speaks of the trivial or nontrivial central character.

The central character and the infinitesimal character of an irreducible representation of any reductive Lie group are important invariants of the representation. In the case of irreducible admissible representations of SL(2, R), it turns out that, generically, there is exactly one representation, up to an isomorphism, with the specified central and infinitesimal characters. In the exceptional cases there are two or three representations with the prescribed parameters, all of which have been determined.

== Finite-dimensional representations ==
For each nonnegative integer n, the group SL(2, R) has an irreducible representation of dimension n + 1, which is unique up to an isomorphism. This representation can be constructed in the space of homogeneous polynomials of degree n in two variables. The case n = 0 corresponds to the trivial representation. An irreducible finite-dimensional representation of a noncompact simple Lie group of dimension greater than 1 is never unitary. Thus this construction produces only one unitary representation of SL(2, R), the trivial representation.

The finite-dimensional representation theory of the noncompact group SL(2, R) is equivalent to the representation theory of SU(2), its compact form, essentially because their Lie algebras have the same complexification and they are "algebraically simply connected". (More precisely, the group SU(2) is simply connected and, although SL(2, R) is not, it has no non-trivial algebraic central extensions.) However, in the general infinite-dimensional case, there is no close correspondence between representations of a group and the representations of its Lie algebra. In fact, it follows from the Peter–Weyl theorem that all irreducible representations of the compact Lie group SU(2) are finite-dimensional and unitary. The situation with SL(2, R) is completely different: it possesses infinite-dimensional irreducible representations, some of which are unitary, and some are not.

== Principal series representations ==
A major technique of constructing representations of a reductive Lie group is the method of parabolic induction. In the case of the group SL(2, R), there is up to conjugacy only one proper parabolic subgroup, the Borel subgroup of the upper-triangular matrices of determinant 1. The inducing parameter of an induced principal series representation is a (possibly non-unitary) character of the multiplicative group of real numbers, which is specified by choosing ε = ± 1 and a complex number μ. The corresponding principal series representation is denoted I_{ε,μ}. It turns out that ε is the central character of the induced representation and the complex number μ may be identified with the infinitesimal character via the Harish-Chandra isomorphism.

The principal series representation I_{ε,μ} (or more precisely its Harish-Chandra module of K-finite elements) admits a basis consisting of elements w_{j}, where the index j runs through the even integers if ε=1 and the odd integers if ε=-1. The action of X, Y, and H is given by the formulas

$$H(w_j) = jw_j$$
$$X(w_j) = {\mu+j+1\over 2}w_{j+2}$$
$$Y(w_j) = {\mu-j+1\over 2}w_{j-2}$$

== Admissible representations ==
Using the fact that it is an eigenvector of the Casimir operator and has an eigenvector for H, it follows easily that any irreducible admissible representation is a subrepresentation of a parabolically induced representation. (This also is true for more general reductive Lie groups and is known as Casselman's subrepresentation theorem.) Thus the irreducible admissible representations of SL(2, R) can be found by decomposing the principal series representations I_{ε,μ} into irreducible components and determining the isomorphisms. We summarize the decompositions as follows:

- I_{ε,μ} is reducible if and only if μ is an integer and ε=−(−1)^{μ}. If I_{ε,μ} is irreducible then it is isomorphic to I_{ε,−μ}.
- I_{−1, 0} splits as the direct sum I_{ε,0} = D_{+0} + D_{−0} of two irreducible representations, called limit of discrete series representations. D_{+0} has a basis w_{j} for j≥1, and D_{−0} has a basis w_{j} for j≤−1,
- If I_{ε,μ} is reducible with μ>0 (so ε=−(−1)^{μ}) then it has a unique irreducible quotient which has finite dimension μ, and the kernel is the sum of two discrete series representations D_{+μ} + D_{−μ}. The representation D_{μ} has a basis w_{μ+j} for j≥1, and D_{−μ} has a basis w_{−μ−j} for j≤−1.
- If I_{ε,μ} is reducible with μ<0 (so ε=−(−1)^{μ}) then it has a unique irreducible subrepresentation, which has finite dimension -μ, and the quotient(cokernel) is the sum of two discrete series representations D_{+μ} + D_{−μ}.

This gives the following list of irreducible admissible representations:

- A finite-dimensional representation of dimension μ for each positive integer μ, with central character −(−1)^{μ}.
- Two limit of discrete series representations D_{+0}, D_{−0}, with μ=0 and non-trivial central character.
- Discrete series representations D_{μ} for μ a non-zero integer, with central character −(−1)^{μ}.
- Two families of irreducible principal series representations I_{ε,μ} for ε≠−(−1)^{μ} (where I_{ε,μ} is isomorphic to I_{ε,−μ}).

=== Relation with the Langlands classification ===
According to the Langlands classification, the irreducible admissible representations are parametrized by certain tempered representations of Levi subgroups M of parabolic subgroups P=MAN. This works as follows:

- The discrete series, limit of discrete series, and unitary principal series representations I_{ε,μ} with μ imaginary are already tempered, so in these cases the parabolic subgroup P is SL(2, R) itself.
- The finite-dimensional representations and the representations I_{ε,μ} for ℜμ>0, μ not an integer or ε≠−(−1)^{μ} are the irreducible quotients of the principal series representations I_{ε,μ} for ℜμ>0, which are induced from tempered representations of the parabolic subgroup P = MAN of upper triangular matrices, with A the positive diagonal matrices and M the center of order 2. For μ a positive integer and ε=−(−1)^{μ} the principal series representation has a finite-dimensional representation as its irreducible quotient, and otherwise it is already irreducible.

== Unitary representations ==
The irreducible unitary representations can be found by checking which of the irreducible admissible representations admit an invariant positively definite Hermitian form. This results in the following list of unitary representations of SL(2, R):

- The trivial representation (the only finite-dimensional representation in this list).
- The two limit of discrete series representations D_{+0}, D_{−0}.
- The discrete series representations D_{k}, indexed by non-zero integers k. They are all distinct.
- The two families of irreducible principal series representation, consisting of the spherical principal series I_{+,iμ} indexed by the real numbers μ, and the non-spherical unitary principal series I_{−,iμ} indexed by the non-zero real numbers μ. The representation with parameter μ is isomorphic to the one with parameter −μ, and there are no further isomorphisms between them.
- The complementary series representations I_{+,μ} for 0<|μ|<1. The representation with parameter μ is isomorphic to the one with parameter −μ, and there are no further isomorphisms between them.

Of these, the two limit of discrete series representations, the discrete series representations, and the two families of principal series representations are tempered, while the trivial and complementary series representations are not tempered.

== See also ==
- Spin (physics)
- Representation theory of SU(2)
- Rotation group SO(3)#A note on Lie algebra
