= Bargmann =

Bargmann is a surname. Notable people with the surname include:

- Cornelia Bargmann (born 1961), American neurobiologist
- Valentine Bargmann (1908–1989), German-American mathematician and theoretical physicist

== See also ==
- Bargmann transform or Segal–Bargmann space
- Bargmann-Michel-Telegdi equation
- Bargmann-Wigner equations
- Bagman
