= Alexandru Proca =

Romanian physicist (1897–1955)

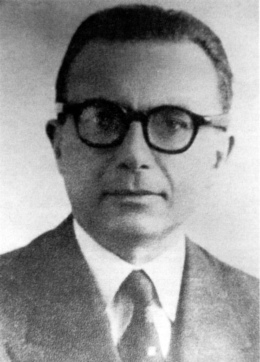
- Born: 16 October 1897; Bucharest, Kingdom of Romania
- Died: 13 December 1955 (aged 58); Paris, France
- Citizenship: Romania; France
- Education: Politehnica University of Bucharest; Paris-Sorbonne University
- Known for: Proca's equations
- Awards: Honorary member of the Romanian Academy (elected post-mortem in 1990)
- Scientific career
- Fields: Theoretical physics
- Thesis: On the relativistic theory of Dirac's electron (1933)
- Doctoral advisor: Louis de Broglie

Alexandru Proca (16 October 1897 – 13 December 1955) was a Romanian physicist who studied and worked in France. He developed the vector meson theory of nuclear forces and the relativistic quantum field equations that bear his name (Proca's equations) for the massive, vector spin-1 mesons.

== Biography ==
He was born in Bucharest, the son of a civil engineer. He was one of the eminent students at the Gheorghe Lazăr High School and Politehnica University in Bucharest. With a very strong interest in theoretical physics, he went to Paris where he graduated in Science from the Paris-Sorbonne University, receiving from the hand of Marie Curie his diploma of Bachelor of Science degree. After that he was employed as a researcher/physicist at the Radium Institute in Paris in 1925.

Proca became a French citizen in 1931. He carried out Ph.D. studies in theoretical physics under the supervision of Nobel laureate Louis de Broglie. In 1933 he defended successfully his Ph.D. thesis entitled "On the relativistic theory of Dirac's electron" in front of an examination committee chaired by the Nobel laureate Jean Perrin.

In 1939 he was invited to the Solvay Conference, which did not take place because of the outbreak of World War II. During the war he was for a short time a senior engineer at Radio France. In 1943 he made a brief stay in Portugal, where (replacing Guido Beck) he guided the seminar on Theoretical Physics, organized by Ruy Luís Gomes at the Center for Mathematical Studies at the University of Porto. From 1943 to 1945 he was in the United Kingdom, at the invitation of the Royal Society and the British Admiralty, in order to assist in the war effort. Afterward he went back to Paris, where he led a seminar on elementary particle physics. He sought to get a chair at the Sorbonne or at the Collège de France, but was unsuccessful. From 1950 he organized a colloquium in theoretical physics for the CNRS with Pierre Auger, while in 1951 he was the French representative at the International Union of Pure and Applied Physics.

In 1937 Proca was elected corresponding member of the Romanian Academy of Sciences, while in 1990 he was elected post-mortem honorary member of the Romanian Academy.

He died in Paris in 1955 after a two-year battle with laryngeal cancer.

== Scientific achievements ==
In 1929, Proca became the editor of the influential physics journal Les Annales de l'Institut Henri Poincaré. Then, in 1934, he spent an entire year with Erwin Schrödinger in Berlin, and visited for a few months with Nobel laureate Niels Bohr in Copenhagen where he also met Werner Heisenberg and George Gamow.

Proca came to be known as one of the most influential Romanian theoretical physicists of the last century, having developed the vector meson theory of nuclear forces in 1936, ahead of the first reports of Hideki Yukawa, who employed Proca's equations for the vectorial mesonic field as a starting point. Yukawa subsequently received the Nobel Prize for an explanation of the nuclear forces by using a pi-mesonic field and predicting correctly the existence of the pion, initially called a 'mesotron' by Yukawa. Pions being the lightest mesons play a key role in explaining the properties of the strong nuclear forces in their lower energy range. Unlike the massive spin-1 bosons in Proca's equations, the pions predicted by Yukawa are spin-0 bosons that have associated only scalar fields. However, there exist also spin-1 mesons, such as those considered in Proca's equations. The spin-1 vector mesons considered by Proca in 1936—1941 have an odd parity, are involved in electroweak interactions, and have been observed in high-energy experiments only after 1960, whereas the pions predicted by Yukawa's theory were experimentally observed by Carl Anderson in 1937 with masses quite close in value to the 100 MeV predicted by Yukawa's theory of pi-mesons published in 1935; the latter theory considered only the massive scalar field as the cause of the nuclear forces, such as those that would be expected to be found in the field of a pi-meson.

In the range of higher masses, vector mesons include also charm and bottom quarks in their structure. The spectrum of heavy mesons is linked through radiative processes to the vector mesons, which are therefore playing important roles in meson spectroscopy. The light-quark vector mesons appear in nearly pure quantum states.

Proca's equations are equations of motion of the Euler–Lagrange type which lead to the Lorenz gauge field conditions: $\partial_\mu A^\mu=0 \!$. In essence, Proca's equations are:

$\Box A^\nu - \partial^\nu (\partial_\mu A^\mu) + m^2 A^\nu = j^\nu$, where:

$$\Box = \left(\frac{1}{c^2}\frac{\partial^2}{\partial t^2}\right)-\nabla^2$$.

Here $A^\mu$ is the 4-potential, the operator $\Box$ in front of this potential is the D'Alembert operator, $j^\nu$ is the current density, and the nabla operator (∇) squared is the Laplace operator, Δ. As this is a relativistic equation, Einstein's summation convention over repeated indices is assumed. The 4-potential $A^\nu$ is the combination of the scalar potential $\phi$ and the 3-vector potential A, derived from Maxwell's equations:

$$A^\nu = \left(\frac{\phi}{c}, \mathbf{A}\right)$$
$$\mathbf{E} = -\mathbf{\nabla} \phi - \frac{\partial \mathbf{A}}{\partial t}$$
$$\mathbf{B} = \mathbf{\nabla} \times \mathbf{A}.$$

With a simplified notation they take the form:

$$\partial_\mu(\partial^\mu A^\nu - \partial^\nu A^\mu)+
\left(\frac{mc}{\hbar}\right)^2 A^\nu=0$$.

Proca's equations thus describe the field of a massive spin-1 particle of mass m with an associated field propagating at the speed of light c in Minkowski spacetime; such a field is characterized by a real vector A resulting in a relativistic Lagrangian density L. They may appear formally to resemble the Klein–Gordon equation:

$$\frac {1}{c^2} \frac{\partial^2}{\partial t^2} \psi - \nabla^2 \psi + \frac {m^2 c^2}{\hbar^2} \psi = 0$$,

but the latter is a scalar, not a vector, equation that was derived for relativistic electrons, and thus it applies only to spin-1/2 fermions. Moreover, the solutions of the Klein–Gordon equation are relativistic wavefunctions that can be represented as quantum plane waves when the equation is written in natural units:

$$- \partial_t^2 \psi + \nabla^2 \psi = m^2 \psi$$;

this scalar equation is only applicable to relativistic fermions which obey the energy-momentum relation in Albert Einstein's special relativity theory. Yukawa's intuition was based on such a scalar Klein–Gordon equation, and Nobel laureate Wolfgang Pauli wrote in 1941: ``...Yukawa supposed the meson to have spin 1 in order to explain the spin dependence of the force between proton and neutron. The theory for this case has been given by Proca".

== See also ==
- Euler–Lagrange equations of motion
- Proca action
- Vector meson
- Klein–Gordon equation
- relativistic electron
- Special relativity
- Nuclear forces
- Yukawa theory
- Pions
- Mesons
- Quarks
