= Joos–Weinberg equation =

Equation for arbitrary spin particles

In relativistic quantum mechanics and quantum field theory, the Joos–Weinberg equation is a relativistic wave equation applicable to free particles of arbitrary spin j, an integer for bosons (j = 1, 2, 3 ...) or half-integer for fermions (j = 1/2, 3/2, 5/2 ...). The solutions to the equations are wavefunctions, mathematically in the form of multi-component spinor fields. The spin quantum number is usually denoted by s in quantum mechanics, however in this context j is more typical in the literature (see references).

It is named after Hans H. Joos and Steven Weinberg, found in the early 1960s.

== Statement ==
Introducing a 2(2j + 1) × 2(2j + 1) matrix;

$$\gamma^{\mu_1 \mu_2 \cdots \mu_{2j}}$$

symmetric in any two tensor indices, which generalizes the gamma matrices in the Dirac equation, the equation is

$$[(i\hbar)^{2j}\gamma^{\mu_1 \mu_2 \cdots \mu_{2j}} \partial_{\mu_1}\partial_{\mu_2}\cdots\partial_{\mu_{2j}} + (mc)^{2j}]\Psi = 0$$

or

$[\gamma^{\mu_1 \mu_2 \cdots \mu_{2j}} P_{\mu_1}P_{\mu_2}\cdots P_{\mu_{2j}} + (mc)^{2j}]\Psi = 0$

4

== Lorentz group structure ==
For the JW equations the representation of the Lorentz group is

$$D^\mathrm{JW} = D^{(j,0)}\oplus D^{(0,j)}.$$

This representation has definite spin j. It turns out that a spin j particle in this representation satisfy field equations too. These equations are very much like the Dirac equations. It is suitable when the symmetries of charge conjugation, time reversal symmetry, and parity are good.

The representations D^{(j, 0)} and D^{(0, j)} can each separately represent particles of spin j. A state or quantum field in such a representation would satisfy no field equation except the Klein–Gordon equation.

=== Lorentz covariant tensor description of Weinberg–Joos states ===
The six-component spin-1 representation space,

$$D^\mathrm{JW} = D^{(1,0)}\oplus D^{(0,1)}$$

can be labeled by a pair of anti-symmetric Lorentz indexes, [αβ], meaning that it transforms as an antisymmetric Lorentz tensor of second rank $B_{[\alpha\beta ]},$ i.e.

$$B_{[\alpha\beta ]}\sim D^{(1,0)}\oplus D^{(0,1)}.$$

The j-fold Kronecker product T_{[α_{1}β_{1}]...[α_{j}β_{j}]} of B_{[αβ]}

| $T_{[\alpha_1\beta_1] \cdots [\alpha_j\beta_j]} = B_{[\alpha_1\beta_1]} \otimes \cdots \otimes B_{[\alpha_j\beta_j]} = \bigotimes_{i=1}^j B_{[\alpha_i\beta_i]},$ | 8A |

decomposes into a finite series of Lorentz-irreducible representation spaces according to

$$\bigotimes_{i=1}^j \left(D_i^{(1,0)}\oplus D_i^{(0,1)}\right) \to D^{(j,0)} \oplus D^{(0,j)} \oplus D^{(j,j)}\oplus \cdots \oplus D^{(j_k, j_l)} \oplus D^{(j_l,j_k)} \oplus \cdots \oplus D^{(0,0)},$$

and necessarily contains a $D^{(j,0)}\oplus D^{(0,j)}$ sector. This sector can instantly be identified by means of a momentum independent projector operator P^{(j,0)}, designed on the basis of C^{(1)}, one of the Casimir elements (invariants) of the Lie algebra of the Lorentz group, which are defined as,

| $$\begin{cases} \left[C^{(1)}\right]_{AB} = \frac 1 4 {\left[M^{\mu\nu}\right]_A}^{C}\left[M_{\mu\nu}\right]_{CB} \\[6pt] \left[C^{(2)}\right]_{AB} =\frac 1 4 \varepsilon_{\mu\nu\lambda\eta} {\left [M^{\mu\nu} \right ]_A}^C \left[M^{\lambda\eta}\right]_{CB} \end{cases} \qquad  A,B,C=1,\ldots,(2j_1+1)(2j_2+1)$$ | 8B |

where M^{μν} are constant (2j_{1}+1)(2j_{2}+1) × (2j_{1}+1)(2j_{2}+1) matrices defining the elements of the Lorentz algebra within the $D^{(j_1, j_2)} \oplus D^{(j_2, j_1)}$ representations. The Capital Latin letter labels indicate the finite dimensionality of the representation spaces under consideration which describe the internal angular momentum (spin) degrees of freedom.

The representation spaces $D^{(j_1, j_2)} \oplus D^{(j_2, j_1)}$ are eigenvectors to C^{(1)} in (8B) according to,

$$C^{(1)} \left[ D^{(j_1,j_2)}\oplus D^{(j_2,j_1)}\right] = \left ( j_1(j_1+1) +j_2(j_2+1) \right ) \left[ D^{(j_1,j_2)} \oplus D^{ (j_2,j_1)} \right],$$

Here we define:

$$\lambda^{(1)}_{(j_1,j_2)} = j_1(j_1+1) +j_2(j_2+1),$$

to be the C^{(1)} eigenvalue of the $D^{(j_1, j_2)} \oplus D^{(j_2, j_1)}$ sector. Using this notation we define the projector operator, P^{(j,0)} in terms of C^{(1)}:

| ${\left[ P^{(j,0)} \right]_{\left[\alpha_1\beta_1\right] \cdots \left[ \alpha_j\beta_j\right]}}^{\left[\rho_1\sigma_1\right]\cdots \left[ \rho_j\sigma_j\right]} = {\left[\prod_{k, l} \left( \frac{C^{(1)} -\lambda^{(1)}_{(j_k,j_l)}} {\lambda^{(1)} _{(j,\, 0)}-\lambda^{(1)}_{(j_k,j_l)}}\right)\right]_{\left[ \alpha_1\beta_1\right]\cdots \left[ \alpha_j\beta_j\right]}}^{\left[\rho_1\sigma_1\right]\cdots \left[ \rho_j \sigma_j\right]}.$ | 8C |

Such projectors can be employed to search through T_{[α_{1}β_{1}]...[α_{j}β_{j}]} for $D^{(j,0)}\oplus D^{(0,j)},$ and exclude all the rest. Relativistic second order wave equations for any j are then straightforwardly obtained in first identifying the $D^{(j,0)}\oplus D^{(0,j)}$ sector in T_{[α_{1}β_{1}]...[α_{j}β_{j}]} in (8A) by means of the Lorentz projector in (8C) and then imposing on the result the mass shell condition.

This algorithm is free from auxiliary conditions. The scheme also extends to half-integer spins, $s= j+\tfrac{1}{2}$ in which case the Kronecker product of T_{[α_{1}β_{1}]...[α_{j}β_{j}]} with the Dirac spinor,

$$D^{\left (\frac{1}{2},0 \right )}\oplus D^{ \left (0,\frac{1}{2} \right)}$$

has to be considered. The choice of the totally antisymmetric Lorentz tensor of second rank, B_{[α_{i}β_{i}]}, in the above equation (8A) is only optional. It is possible to start with multiple Kronecker products of totally symmetric second rank Lorentz tensors, A_{α_{i}β_{i}}. The latter option should be of interest in theories where high-spin $D^{(j,0)}\oplus D^{(0,j)}$ Joos–Weinberg fields preferably couple to symmetric tensors, such as the metric tensor in gravity.

==== An Example ====
The

$$\left (\tfrac{3}{2}, 0 \right ) \oplus \left (0, \tfrac{3}{2} \right )$$

transforming in the Lorenz tensor spinor of second rank,

$$\psi_{[\mu \nu]} = [ (1,0) \oplus (0,1)] \otimes \left [ \left (\tfrac{1}{2}, 0 \right ) \oplus \left (0, \tfrac{1}{2} \right ) \right ].$$

The Lorentz group generators within this representation space are denoted by $\left [M^{ATS}_{\mu\nu} \right ]_{[ \alpha\beta][\gamma\delta]},$ and given by:

$$\left [M^{ATS}_{\mu\nu} \right ]_{[ \alpha\beta][\gamma\delta]}= \left [M^{AT}_{\mu\nu} \right ]_{[\alpha\beta][\gamma\delta]}{\mathbf 1}^S+ {\mathbf 1}_{[\alpha\beta][\gamma\delta]}\,\,
\left[M^S_{\mu\nu}\right],$$
$$\mathbf{1}_{[\alpha\beta][\gamma\delta]}=\tfrac{1}{2} \left (g_{\alpha\gamma}g_{\beta\delta}-g_{\alpha\delta}g_{\beta\gamma} \right ),$$
$$M^{S}_{\mu\nu}=\tfrac{1}{2}\sigma_{\mu\nu}=\frac{i}{4}[\gamma_\mu,\gamma_{\nu}],$$

where 1_{[αβ][γδ]} stands for the identity in this space, 1^{S} and M^{S}_{μν} are the respective unit operator and the Lorentz algebra elements within the Dirac space, while γ_{μ} are the standard gamma matrices. The [M^{AT}_{μν}]_{[αβ][γδ]} generators express in terms of the generators in the four-vector,

$$\left [M^{V}_{\mu\nu} \right ]_{\alpha\beta}=i \left (g_{\alpha\mu}g_{\beta\nu}-g_{\alpha \nu}g_{\beta\mu} \right ),$$

as

$$\left[M_{\mu\nu}^{AT}\right]_{[\alpha\beta][\gamma\delta]} =-2 \cdot {\mathbf{1}_{[\alpha\beta]}}^{[\kappa\sigma]} {\left[M^V_{\mu\nu}\right]_\sigma}^\rho{\mathbf 1}_{[\rho\kappa][\gamma\delta]}.$$

Then, the explicit expression for the Casimir invariant C^{(1)} in (8B) takes the form,

$$\left [C^{(1)} \right ]_{[\alpha\beta][\gamma\delta]}= -\frac{1}{8} \left (\sigma_{\alpha\beta}\sigma_{\gamma\delta}- \sigma_{\gamma\delta}\sigma_{\alpha\beta}-22 \cdot \mathbf{1}_{[\alpha\beta][\gamma\delta]} \right),$$

and the Lorentz projector on (3/2,0)⊕(0,3/2) is given by,

$$\left[P^{\left(\frac 3 2, 0\right)}\right]_{[\alpha\beta][\gamma\delta]}=\frac 1 8 \left (\sigma_{\alpha\beta}\sigma_{\gamma\delta} + \sigma_{\gamma\delta} \sigma_{\alpha\beta} \right )-\frac 1 {12} \sigma_{\alpha\beta} \sigma_{\gamma\delta}.$$

In effect, the (3/2,0)⊕(0,3/2) degrees of freedom, denoted by

$$\left[w^{\left(\frac{3}{2},0\right)}_\pm \left({\mathbf p},\tfrac{3}{2},\lambda\right)\right]^{[\gamma\delta]}$$

are found to solve the following second order equation,

$$\left ( {\left[P^{\left(\frac 3 2, 0\right)} \right]^{[\alpha\beta]}}_{[\gamma\delta]} p^2-m^2 \cdot {{\mathbf 1}^{[\alpha\beta]}}_{[\gamma\delta]} \right )\left[ w^{\left(\frac 3 2, 0 \right)}_\pm \left({\mathbf p},\tfrac 3 2, \lambda\right)\right]^{[\gamma\delta]}=0.$$

Expressions for the solutions can be found in.

== See also ==
- Higher-dimensional gamma matrices
- Bargmann–Wigner equations, alternative equations which describe free particles of any spin
- Higher spin theory
