= Hans Joos =

German physicist (1926–2010)

Hans H. Joos (31 December 1926, Stuttgart – 18 November 2010, Hamburg) was a German theoretical physicist. He is known for the Joos–Weinberg equation, independently published by Steven Weinberg.

== Education and career ==
Joos studied at the University of Tübingen, where he was mentored by Gert Molière (1909–1964). After graduation, Joos worked in São Paulo and at the University of Hamburg, where he received his doctorate (Promotion) in 1961. As a postdoc he worked in at the Institute for Advanced Study in Princeton (for the academic year 1961–1962), at the University of Minnesota, and at CERN. From 1963 until his retirement, he was a member of the scientific research team at Germany's national research centre Deutsches Elektronen-Synchrotron (DESY) in Hamburg and was for some years the head of DESY's theory group. In 1965 he was appointed Honorarprofessor of theoretical physics at the University of Hamburg. He served on the editorial board of Communications in Mathematical Physics. He lived in Halstenbek (on the north-western border of Hamburg).

== Selected publications ==
=== Articles ===
- Joos, Hans (1962). "Zur Darstellungstheorie der inhomogenen Lorentzgruppe als Grundlage quantenmechanischer Kinematik". Fortschritte der Physik. 10 (3): 65–146. Bibcode:1962ForPh..10...65J. doi:10.1002/prop.2180100302. abstract
- Joos, H.; Kramer, G. (1964). "Photoproduction of ρ- and ω-mesons in the peripheral model". Zeitschrift für Physik. 178 (5): 542–550. Bibcode:1964ZPhy..178..542J. doi:10.1007/BF01379480. S2CID 118137916.
- Joos, Hans (1964). "Group-Theoretical Models of Local-Field Theories". Journal of Mathematical Physics. 5 (2): 155–164. Bibcode:1964JMP.....5..155J. doi:10.1063/1.1704104.
- Joos, H. (1967). "A remark on the photoproduction of vector mesons". Physics Letters B. 24 (2): 103–105. Bibcode:1967PhLB...24..103J. doi:10.1016/0370-2693(67)90359-0.
- Joos, H.; Schrader, R. (1968). "On the primitive characters of the Poincaré group". Communications in Mathematical Physics. 7 (1): 21–50. Bibcode:1968CMaPh...7...21J. doi:10.1007/BF01651216. S2CID 122086054. https://link.springer.com/article/10.1007/BF01651216
- Urban, Paul, ed. (13 March 2013). "Introduction to Quark Confinement in QCD by Hans Jost". Quarks and Leptons as Fundamental Particles: Proceedings of the XVIII. Internationale Universitätswochen für Kernphysik 1979 der Karl-Franzens-Universität Graz at Schladming (Steiermark, Austria), 28th February - 10th March 1979. Springer. pp. 407–483. ISBN 9783709185742; pbk reprint of 1979 1st edition
- Becher, P.; Joos, H. (1982). "The Dirac-Kähler equation and fermions on the lattice". Zeitschrift für Physik C. 15 (4): 343–365. Bibcode:1982ZPhyC..15..343B. doi:10.1007/BF01614426. S2CID 121826544.
- Joos, H.; Montvay, I. (1983). "The screening of colour charge in the numerical hopping-parameter expansion". Nuclear Physics B. 225 (4): 565–578. Bibcode:1983NuPhB.225..565J. doi:10.1016/0550-3213(83)90534-5.
- 't Hooft, G.; Jaffe, A.; Lehmann, G.; Mitter, P. K.; Singer, I. M., eds. (2012). "On Kähler's Geometric Description of Dirac Fields by M. Göckeler and H. Joos". Progress in Gauge Field Theory. Proceedings of a NATO Advanced Study Institute on Progress in Gauge Field Theory, held September 1–15, 1983, in Cargèse, Corsica, France. NATO ASI series, Series B, Physics. Vol. 115. Springer Science & Business Media. pp. 247–270. ISBN 9781475702804; pbk reprint of 1984 1st edition; doi:10.1007/978-1-4757-0280-4_9
- Joos, H.; Schaefer, M. (1987). "The representation theory of the symmetry group of lattice fermions as a basis for kinematics in lattice QCD". Zeitschrift für Physik C. 34 (4): 465–480. Bibcode:1987ZPhyC..34..465J. doi:10.1007/BF01679865. hdl:21.11116/0000-0007-A155-3. S2CID 123273715.

=== Books ===
- Böhm, Manfred; Denner, Ansgar; Joos, Hans (2001). Gauge Theories of the Strong and Electroweak Interaction. Wiesbaden: Vieweg+Teubner Verlag. doi:10.1007/978-3-322-80160-9. ISBN 978-3-322-80162-3. S2CID 117836770. abstract (for 1981 edition) provided by U.S. Department of Energy, Office of Scientific and Technical Information; abstract (for 1981 edition) provided by International Atomic Energy Agency (IAEA); The 1981 edition in English is a translation of the 3rd edition of the German book Eichtheorien der starken und elektroschwachen Wechselwirkung, Teubner Studienbücher; ISBN 3519030454.
