= Bargmann's limit =

In quantum mechanics, Bargmann's limit, named for Valentine Bargmann, provides an upper bound on the number $N_\ell$ of bound states with azimuthal quantum number $\ell$ in a system with central potential $V$. It takes the form

$$N_\ell < \frac{1}{2\ell+1} \frac{2m}{\hbar^2} \int_0^\infty r |V(r)|\, dr$$

This limit is the best possible upper bound in such a way that for a given $\ell$, one can always construct a potential $V_\ell$ for which $N_\ell$ is arbitrarily close to this upper bound. Note that the Dirac delta function potential attains this limit. After the first proof of this inequality by Valentine Bargmann in 1953, Julian Schwinger presented an alternative way of deriving it in 1961.

== Rigorous formulation and proof ==
Stated in a formal mathematical way, Bargmann's limit goes as follows. Let $V:\mathbb{R}^3\to\mathbb{R}:\mathbf{r}\mapsto V(r)$ be a spherically symmetric potential, such that it is piecewise continuous in $r$, $V(r)=O(1/r^a)$ for $r\to0$ and $V(r)=O(1/r^b)$ for $r\to+\infty$, where $a\in(2,+\infty)$ and $b\in(-\infty,2)$. If

$$\int_0^{+\infty}r|V(r)|dr<+\infty,$$

then the number of bound states $N_\ell$ with azimuthal quantum number $\ell$ for a particle of mass $m$ obeying the corresponding Schrödinger equation, is bounded from above by

$$N_\ell<\frac{1}{2\ell+1}\frac{2m}{\hbar^2}\int_0^{+\infty}r|V(r)|dr.$$

Although the original proof by Valentine Bargmann is quite technical, the main idea follows from two general theorems on ordinary differential equations, the Sturm Oscillation Theorem and the Sturm-Picone Comparison Theorem. If we denote by $u_{0\ell}$ the wave function subject to the given potential with total energy $E=0$ and azimuthal quantum number $\ell$, the Sturm Oscillation Theorem implies that $N_\ell$ equals the number of nodes of $u_{0\ell}$. From the Sturm-Picone Comparison Theorem, it follows that when subject to a stronger potential $W$ (i.e. $W(r)\leq V(r)$ for all $r\in\mathbb{R}_0^+$), the number of nodes either grows or remains the same. Thus, more specifically, we can replace the potential $V$ by $-|V|$. For the corresponding wave function with total energy $E=0$ and azimuthal quantum number $\ell$, denoted by $\phi_{0\ell}$, the radial Schrödinger equation becomes

$$\frac{d^{2}}{d r^{2}} \phi_{0\ell}(r)-\frac{\ell(\ell+1)}{r^{2}} \phi_{0\ell}(r)=-W(r) \phi_{0\ell}(r),$$

with $W=2m|V|/\hbar^2$. By applying variation of parameters, one can obtain the following implicit solution

$$\phi_{0\ell}(r)=r^{\ell+1}-\int_{0}^{p} G(r, \rho) \phi_{0\ell}(\rho) W(\rho) d \rho,$$

where $G(r,\rho)$ is given by

$$G(r, \rho)=\frac{1}{2 \ell+1}\left[r\bigg(\frac{r}{\rho}\bigg)^{\ell}-\rho\bigg(\frac{\rho}{r}\bigg)^{\ell}\right].$$

If we now denote all successive nodes of $\phi_{0\ell}$ by $0=\nu_1<\nu_2<\dots<\nu_{N}$, one can show from the implicit solution above that for consecutive nodes $\nu_{i}$ and $\nu_{i+1}$

$$\frac{2m}{\hbar^2}\int_{\nu_{i}}^{\nu_{i+1}} r|V(r)|dr>2\ell+1.$$

From this, we can conclude that

$$\frac{2m}{\hbar^2}\int_{0}^{+\infty}r|V(r)|dr\geq\frac{2m}{\hbar^2}\int_{0}^{\nu_N}r|V(r)|dr>N(2\ell+1)\geq N_\ell(2\ell+1),$$

proving Bargmann's limit. Note that as the integral on the right is assumed to be finite, so must be $N$ and $N_\ell$. Furthermore, for a given value of $\ell$, one can always construct a potential $V_\ell$ for which $N_\ell$ is arbitrarily close to Bargmann's limit. The idea to obtain such a potential, is to approximate Dirac delta function potentials, as these attain the limit exactly. An example of such a construction can be found in Bargmann's original paper.
