= Stationary state =

Quantum state with all observables independent of time

A stationary state is a quantum state with all observables independent of time. It is an eigenvector of the energy operator (instead of a quantum superposition of different energies). It is also called energy eigenvector, energy eigenstate, energy eigenfunction, or energy eigenket. It is very similar to the concept of atomic orbital and molecular orbital in chemistry, with some slight differences explained below.

== Introduction ==
A harmonic oscillator in classical mechanics (A–B) and quantum mechanics (C–H). In (A–B), a ball, attached to a spring, oscillates back and forth. (C–H) are six solutions to the Schrödinger equation for this situation. The horizontal axis is position, the vertical axis is the real part (blue) or imaginary part (red) of the wavefunction. (C, D, E, F), but not (G, H), are stationary states, or standing waves. The standing-wave oscillation frequency, multiplied by the Planck constant, is the energy of the state.

A stationary state is called stationary because the system remains in the same state as time elapses, in every observable way. For a single-particle Hamiltonian, this means that the particle has a constant probability distribution for its position, its velocity, its spin, etc. (This is true assuming the particle's environment is also static, i.e. the Hamiltonian is unchanging in time.) The wavefunction itself is not stationary: It continually changes its overall complex phase factor, so as to form a standing wave. The oscillation frequency of the standing wave, multiplied by the Planck constant, is the energy of the state according to the Planck–Einstein relation.

Stationary states are quantum states that are solutions to the time-independent Schrödinger equation:
$$\hat H |\Psi\rangle = E_\Psi |\Psi\rangle,$$
where

- $|\Psi\rangle$ is a quantum state, which is a stationary state if it satisfies this equation;
- $\hat H$ is the Hamiltonian operator;
- $E_\Psi$ is a real number, and corresponds to the energy eigenvalue of the state $|\Psi\rangle$.

This is an eigenvalue equation: $\hat H$ is a linear operator on a vector space, $|\Psi\rangle$ is an eigenvector of $\hat H$, and $E_\Psi$ is its eigenvalue.

If a stationary state $|\Psi\rangle$ is plugged into the time-dependent Schrödinger equation, the result is
$$i\hbar\frac{\partial}{\partial t} |\Psi\rangle = E_\Psi|\Psi\rangle.$$

Assuming that $\hat H$ is time-independent (unchanging in time), this equation holds for any time t. Therefore, this is a differential equation describing how $|\Psi\rangle$ varies in time. Its solution is
$$|\Psi(t)\rangle = e^{-iE_\Psi t/\hbar} |\Psi(0)\rangle.$$

Therefore, a stationary state is a standing wave that oscillates with an overall complex phase factor, and its oscillation angular frequency is equal to its energy divided by $\hbar$.

== Stationary state properties ==
Three wavefunction solutions to the time-dependent Schrödinger equation for a harmonic oscillator. Left: The real part (blue) and imaginary part (red) of the wavefunction. Right: The probability of finding the particle at a certain position. The top two rows are two stationary states, and the bottom is the superposition state $\psi_N \equiv (\psi_0 + \psi_1)/\sqrt{2}$, which is not a stationary state. The right column illustrates why stationary states are called "stationary".

As shown above, a stationary state is not mathematically constant:
$$|\Psi(t)\rangle = e^{-iE_\Psi t/\hbar}|\Psi(0)\rangle.$$

However, all observable properties of the state are in fact constant in time. For example, if $|\Psi(t)\rangle$ represents a simple one-dimensional single-particle wavefunction $\Psi(x, t)$, the probability that the particle is at location x is
$$|\Psi(x, t)|^2 =
\left|e^{-iE_\Psi t/\hbar} \Psi(x, 0)\right|^2 =
\left|e^{-iE_\Psi t/\hbar}\right|^2 \left|\Psi(x, 0)\right|^2 =
\left|\Psi(x, 0)\right|^2,$$
which is independent of the time t.

The Heisenberg picture is an alternative mathematical formulation of quantum mechanics where stationary states are truly mathematically constant in time.

As mentioned above, these equations assume that the Hamiltonian is time-independent. This means simply that stationary states are only stationary when the rest of the system is fixed and stationary as well. For example, a 1s electron in a hydrogen atom is in a stationary state, but if the hydrogen atom reacts with another atom, then the electron will of course be disturbed.

== Spontaneous decay ==
Spontaneous decay complicates the question of stationary states. For example, according to simple (nonrelativistic) quantum mechanics, the hydrogen atom has many stationary states: 1s, 2s, 2p, and so on, are all stationary states. But in reality, only the ground state 1s is truly "stationary": An electron in a higher energy level will spontaneously emit one or more photons to decay into the ground state. This seems to contradict the idea that stationary states should have unchanging properties.

The explanation is that the Hamiltonian used in nonrelativistic quantum mechanics is only an approximation to the Hamiltonian from quantum field theory. The higher-energy electron states (2s, 2p, 3s, etc.) are stationary states according to the approximate Hamiltonian, but not stationary according to the true Hamiltonian, because of vacuum fluctuations. On the other hand, the 1s state is truly a stationary state, according to both the approximate and the true Hamiltonian.

== Comparison to "orbital" in chemistry ==
An orbital is a stationary state (or approximation thereof) of a one-electron atom or molecule; more specifically, an atomic orbital for an electron in an atom, or a molecular orbital for an electron in a molecule.

For a molecule that contains only a single electron (e.g. atomic hydrogen or H_{2}^{+}), an orbital is exactly the same as a total stationary state of the molecule. However, for a many-electron molecule, an orbital is completely different from a total stationary state, which is a many-particle state requiring a more complicated description (such as a Slater determinant). In particular, in a many-electron molecule, an orbital is not the total stationary state of the molecule, but rather the stationary state of a single electron within the molecule. This concept of an orbital is only meaningful under the approximation that if we ignore the electron–electron instantaneous repulsion terms in the Hamiltonian as a simplifying assumption, we can decompose the total eigenvector of a many-electron molecule into separate contributions from individual electron stationary states (orbitals), each of which are obtained under the one-electron approximation. (Luckily, chemists and physicists can often (but not always) use this "single-electron approximation".) In this sense, in a many-electron system, an orbital can be considered as the stationary state of an individual electron in the system.

In chemistry, calculation of molecular orbitals typically also assume the Born–Oppenheimer approximation.

== See also ==
- Transition of state
- Quantum number
- Quantum mechanic vacuum or vacuum state
- Virtual particle
- Steady state
