= Bargmann–Wigner equations =

Wave equation for arbitrary spin particles

In relativistic quantum mechanics and quantum field theory, the Bargmann–Wigner equations describe free particles with non-zero mass and arbitrary spin j, an integer for bosons (j = 1, 2, 3 ...) or half-integer for fermions (j = 1/2, 3/2, 5/2 ...). The solutions to the equations are wavefunctions, mathematically in the form of multi-component spinor fields.

They are named after Valentine Bargmann and Eugene Wigner.

== History ==
Paul Dirac first published the Dirac equation in 1928, and later (1936) extended it to particles of any half-integer spin before Fierz and Pauli subsequently found the same equations in 1939, and about a decade before Bargman, and Wigner. Eugene Wigner wrote a paper in 1937 about unitary representations of the inhomogeneous Lorentz group, or the Poincaré group. Wigner notes Ettore Majorana and Dirac used infinitesimal operators applied to functions. Wigner classifies representations as irreducible, factorial, and unitary.

In 1948 Valentine Bargmann and Wigner published the equations now named after them in a paper on a group theoretical discussion of relativistic wave equations.

== Statement of the equations ==
For a free particle of spin j without electric charge, the BW equations are a set of 2j coupled linear partial differential equations, each with a similar mathematical form to the Dirac equation. The full set of equations are: (Note: This article uses the Einstein summation convention for tensor/spinor indices, and uses hats for quantum operators)

$$\begin{align}
& \left (-\gamma^\mu \hat{P}_\mu + mc \right )_{\alpha_1 \alpha_1'}\psi_{\alpha'_1 \alpha_2 \alpha_3 \cdots \alpha_{2j}} = 0 \\
& \left (-\gamma^\mu \hat{P}_\mu + mc \right )_{\alpha_2 \alpha_2'}\psi_{\alpha_1 \alpha'_2 \alpha_3 \cdots \alpha_{2j}} = 0 \\
& \qquad \vdots \\
& \left (-\gamma^\mu \hat{P}_\mu + mc \right )_{\alpha_{2j} \alpha'_{2j}}\psi_{\alpha_1 \alpha_2 \alpha_3 \cdots \alpha'_{2j}} = 0 \\
\end{align}$$

which follow the pattern;

$\left (-\gamma^\mu \hat{P}_\mu + mc \right )_{\alpha_r \alpha'_r}\psi_{\alpha_1 \cdots \alpha'_r \cdots \alpha_{2j}} = 0$

1

for r = 1, 2, ... 2j. (Some authors e.g. Loide and Saar use n = 2j to remove factors of 2. Also the spin quantum number is usually denoted by s in quantum mechanics, however in this context j is more typical in the literature). The entire wavefunction ψ = ψ(r, t) has components

$$\psi_{\alpha_1 \alpha_2 \alpha_3 \cdots \alpha_{2j}} (\mathbf{r},t)$$

and is a rank-2j 4-component spinor field. Each index takes the values 1, 2, 3, or 4, so there are 4^{2j} components of the entire spinor field ψ, although a completely symmetric wavefunction reduces the number of independent components to 2(2j + 1). Further, γ^{μ} = (γ^{0}, γ) are the gamma matrices, and

$$\hat{P}_\mu = i\hbar \partial_\mu$$

is the 4-momentum operator.

The operator constituting each equation, (−γ^{μ}P_{μ} + mc) = (−iħγ^{μ}∂_{μ} + mc), is a 4 × 4 matrix, because of the γ^{μ} matrices, and the mc term scalar-multiplies the 4 × 4 identity matrix (usually not written for simplicity). Explicitly, in the Dirac representation of the gamma matrices:

$$\begin{align}
-\gamma^\mu \hat{P}_\mu + mc & = -\gamma^0 \frac{\hat{E}}{c} - \boldsymbol{\gamma}\cdot(-\hat{\mathbf{p}}) + mc \\ [6pt]
& = -\begin{pmatrix}
I_2 & 0 \\
0 & -I_2 \\
\end{pmatrix}\frac{\hat{E}}{c}
+
\begin{pmatrix}
0 & \boldsymbol{\sigma}\cdot\hat{\mathbf{p}} \\
-\boldsymbol{\sigma}\cdot\hat{\mathbf{p}} & 0 \\
\end{pmatrix} + \begin{pmatrix}
I_2 & 0 \\
0 & I_2 \\
\end{pmatrix}mc \\ [8pt]
& =
\begin{pmatrix}
-\frac{\hat{E}}{c}+mc & 0 & \hat{p}_z & \hat{p}_x - i\hat{p}_y \\
0 & -\frac{\hat{E}}{c}+mc & \hat{p}_x + i\hat{p}_y & -\hat{p}_z \\
-\hat{p}_z & -(\hat{p}_x - i\hat{p}_y) & \frac{\hat{E}}{c}+mc & 0 \\
-(\hat{p}_x + i\hat{p}_y) & \hat{p}_z & 0 & \frac{\hat{E}}{c}+mc \\
\end{pmatrix} \\
\end{align}$$

where σ = (σ_{1}, σ_{2}, σ_{3}) = (σ_{x}, σ_{y}, σ_{z}) is a vector of the Pauli matrices, E is the energy operator, p = (p_{1}, p_{2}, p_{3}) = (p_{x}, p_{y}, p_{z}) is the 3-momentum operator, I_{2} denotes the 2 × 2 identity matrix, the zeros (in the second line) are actually 2 × 2 blocks of zero matrices.

The above matrix operator contracts with one Dirac spinor index of ψ at a time (see matrix multiplication), so some properties of the Dirac equation also apply to the BW equations:

- the equations are Lorentz covariant,
- all components of the solutions ψ also satisfy the Klein–Gordon equation, and hence fulfill the relativistic energy–momentum relation,

$$E^2 = (pc)^2 + (mc^2)^2$$

- second quantization is still possible.

Unlike the Dirac equation, which can incorporate the electromagnetic field via minimal coupling, the B–W formalism comprises intrinsic contradictions and difficulties when the electromagnetic field interaction is incorporated. In other words, it is not possible to make the change P_{μ} → P_{μ} − eA_{μ}, where e is the electric charge of the particle and A_{μ} = (A_{0}, A) is the electromagnetic four-potential. An indirect approach to investigate electromagnetic influences of the particle is to derive the electromagnetic four-currents and multipole moments for the particle, rather than include the interactions in the wave equations themselves.

== Lorentz group structure ==
The representation of the Lorentz group for the BW equations is

$$D^\mathrm{BW} = \bigotimes_{r=1}^{2j} \left[ D_r^{(1/2,0)}\oplus D_r^{(0,1/2)}\right]\,.$$

where each D_{r} is an irreducible representation. This representation does not have definite spin unless j equals 1/2 or 0. One may perform a Clebsch–Gordan decomposition to find the irreducible (A, B) terms and hence the spin content. This redundancy necessitates that a particle of definite spin j that transforms under the D^{BW} representation satisfies field equations.

The representations D^{(j, 0)} and D^{(0, j)} can each separately represent particles of spin j. A state or quantum field in such a representation would satisfy no field equation except the Klein–Gordon equation.

== Formulation in curved spacetime ==
Following M. Kenmoku, in local Minkowski space, the gamma matrices satisfy the anticommutation relations:

$$[\gamma^i,\gamma^j]_{+} = 2\eta^{ij}I_4$$

where η^{ij} = diag(−1, 1, 1, 1) is the Minkowski metric. For the Latin indices here, i, j = 0, 1, 2, 3. In curved spacetime they are similar:

$$[\gamma^\mu,\gamma^\nu]_{+} = 2g^{\mu\nu}$$

where the spatial gamma matrices are contracted with the vierbein b_{i}^{μ} to obtain γ^{μ} = b_{i}^{μ} γ^{i}, and g^{μν} = b^{iμ}b_{i}^{ν} is the metric tensor. For the Greek indices; μ, ν = 0, 1, 2, 3.

A covariant derivative for spinors is given by

$$\mathcal{D}_\mu=\partial_\mu+\Omega_\mu$$

with the connection Ω given in terms of the spin connection ω by:

$$\Omega_\mu =\frac{1}{4}\partial_\mu\omega^{ij} (\gamma_i\gamma_j-\gamma_j\gamma_i)$$

The covariant derivative transforms like ψ:

$$\mathcal{D}_\mu\psi \rightarrow D(\Lambda) \mathcal{D}_\mu \psi$$

With this setup, equation (1) becomes:

$$\begin{align}
& (-i\hbar\gamma^\mu \mathcal{D}_\mu + mc)_{\alpha_1 \alpha_1'}\psi_{\alpha'_1 \alpha_2 \alpha_3 \cdots \alpha_{2j}} = 0 \\
& (-i\hbar\gamma^\mu \mathcal{D}_\mu + mc)_{\alpha_2 \alpha_2'}\psi_{\alpha_1 \alpha'_2 \alpha_3 \cdots \alpha_{2j}} = 0 \\
& \qquad \vdots \\
& (-i\hbar\gamma^\mu \mathcal{D}_\mu + mc)_{\alpha_{2j} \alpha'_{2j}}\psi_{\alpha_1 \alpha_2 \alpha_3 \cdots \alpha'_{2j}} = 0 \,.\\
\end{align}$$

== See also ==
- Two-body Dirac equation
- Generalizations of Pauli matrices
- Wigner D-matrix
- Weyl–Brauer matrices
- Higher-dimensional gamma matrices
- Joos–Weinberg equation, alternative equations which describe free particles of any spin
- Higher-spin theory
