= Proca action =

Action of a massive abelian gauge field

In physics, specifically field theory and particle physics, the Proca action describes a massive spin-1 field of mass m in Minkowski spacetime. The corresponding equation is a relativistic wave equation called the Proca equation. The Proca action and equation are named after Romanian physicist Alexandru Proca.

The Proca equation is involved in the Standard Model and describes there the three massive vector bosons, i.e. the Z and W bosons.

This article uses the (+−−−) metric signature and tensor index notation in the language of 4-vectors.

== Lagrangian density ==
The field involved is a complex 4-potential $B^\mu = \left (\frac{\phi}{c}, \mathbf{A} \right)$, where $\phi$ is a kind of generalized electric potential and $\mathbf{A}$ is a generalized magnetic potential. The field $B^\mu$ transforms like a complex four-vector.

The Lagrangian density is given by:

$$\mathcal{L}=-\frac{1}{2}(\partial_\mu B_\nu^*-\partial_\nu B_\mu^*)(\partial^\mu B^\nu-\partial^\nu B^\mu)+\frac{m^2 c^2}{\hbar^2}B_\nu^* B^\nu,$$

where $c$ is the speed of light in vacuum, $\hbar$ is the reduced Planck constant, and $\partial_{\mu}$ is the 4-gradient.

== Equation ==
The Euler–Lagrange equation of motion for this case, also called the Proca equation, is:

$$\partial_\mu \Bigl( \partial^\mu B^\nu - \partial^\nu B^\mu \Bigr) + \left( \frac{ m c }{\hbar} \right)^2 B^\nu = 0,$$

which is conjugate equivalent to

$$\left[ \partial_\mu \partial^\mu + \left( \frac{ m c }{ \hbar } \right)^2 \right]B^\nu = 0$$

and for m ≠ 0 implies

$$\partial_\nu B^\nu = 0 ,$$

equivalent to a generalized Lorenz gauge condition. For the massive case however, this is a physical constraint rather than an optional gauge condition. For non-zero sources, with all fundamental constants included, the field equation is:

$$c \mu_0 j^\nu = \left[ g^{\mu \nu } \left( \partial_\sigma \partial^\sigma + \frac{ m^2 c^2 }{ \hbar^2 } \right) - \partial^\nu \partial^\mu \right] B_\mu$$

When $m = 0$, the source-free equations reduce to Maxwell's equations without charge or current, and the above reduces to Maxwell's charge equation. This Proca field equation is closely related to the Klein–Gordon equation, because it is second order in space and time.

In the vector calculus notation, the source-free equations are:

$$\Box \phi - \frac{ \partial }{\partial t} \left(\frac{ 1 }{ c^2} \frac{ \partial \phi }{ \partial t } + \nabla\cdot\mathbf{A} \right) = -\left(\frac{ m c }{\hbar}\right)^2 \phi$$
$$\Box \mathbf{A} + \nabla \left( \frac{ 1 }{ c^2 } \frac{ \partial \phi }{\partial t} + \nabla \cdot \mathbf{A} \right) = -\left(\frac{ m c }{ \hbar }\right)^2 \mathbf{A}$$

and $\Box$ is the D'Alembert operator.

== Gauge fixing ==
The Proca action is the gauge-fixed version of the Stueckelberg action via the Higgs mechanism. Quantizing the Proca action requires the use of second class constraints.

If $m \neq 0$, they are not invariant under the gauge transformations of electromagnetism

$$B^\mu \mapsto B^\mu - \partial^\mu f$$

where $f$ is an arbitrary function.

== See also ==
- Electromagnetic field
- Photon
- Quantum electrodynamics
- Quantum gravity
- Vector boson
- Relativistic wave equations
- Klein–Gordon equation (spin 0)
- Dirac equation (spin 1/2)
