= Energy operator =

Operator in quantum mechanics

In quantum mechanics, energy is defined in terms of the energy operator, acting on the wave function of the system as a consequence of time translation symmetry.

== Definition ==
It is given by:
$$\hat{E} = i\hbar\frac{\partial}{\partial t}$$

It acts on the wave function (the probability amplitude for different configurations of the system)
$$\Psi\left(\mathbf{r}, t\right)$$

== Application ==
The energy operator corresponds to the full energy of a system. The Schrödinger equation describes the space- and time-dependence of the slow changing (non-relativistic) wave function of a quantum system. The solution of the Schrödinger equation for a bound system is discrete (a set of permitted states, each characterized by an energy level) which results in the concept of quanta.

=== Schrödinger equation ===
Using the energy operator in the Schrödinger equation:
$$i\hbar\frac{\partial}{\partial t} \Psi(\mathbf{r},\,t) = \hat H \Psi(\mathbf{r},t)$$
one obtains:
$$\hat{E}\Psi(\mathbf{r}, t) = \hat{H} \Psi(\mathbf{r}, t)$$

where i is the imaginary unit, ħ is the reduced Planck constant, and $\hat H$ is the Hamiltonian operator expressed as:

$$\hat{H} =- \frac{\hbar^2}{2m}\nabla^2+V(x).$$

From the equation, the equality can be made:$\langle E \rangle = \langle\hat{H}\rangle$, where $\langle E \rangle$ is the expectation value of energy.

==== Properties ====
It can be shown that the expectation value of energy will always be greater than or equal to the minimum potential of the system.

Consider computing the expectation value of kinetic energy:

$$\begin{align}
KE &= -\frac{\hbar^2}{2m} \int_{-\infty}^{+\infty} \psi^* \left(\frac{d^2\psi}{dx^2}\right) \, dx
\\ &=-\frac{\hbar^2}{2m} \left( {\left[ \psi'(x) \psi^*(x) \right]_{-\infty}^{+\infty}} - \int_{-\infty}^{+\infty} \left(\frac{d\psi}{dx}  \right)\left(\frac{d\psi}{dx}  \right)^* \, dx \right)
\\ &= \frac{\hbar^2}{2m} \int_{-\infty}^{+\infty} \left|\frac{d\psi}{dx}  \right|^2 \, dx  \geq 0
\end{align}$$

Hence the expectation value of kinetic energy is always non-negative. This result can be used with the linearity condition to calculate the expectation value of the total energy which is given for a normalized wavefunction as:

$E = KE + \langle V(x) \rangle = KE + \int_{-\infty}^{+\infty} V(x) |\psi(x)|^2 \, dx \geq V_{\text{min}}(x) \int_{-\infty}^{+\infty} |\psi(x)|^2 \, dx \geq V_{\text{min}}(x)$

which complete the proof. Similarly, the same condition can be generalized to any higher dimensions.

==== Constant energy ====
Working from the definition, a partial solution for a wavefunction of a particle with a constant energy can be constructed. If the wavefunction is assumed to be separable, then the time dependence can be stated as $e^{-iEt/\hbar}$, where E is the constant energy. In full,
$$\Psi(\mathbf{r}, t) = \psi(\mathbf{r}) e^{-iEt/\hbar}$$
where $\psi(\mathbf{r})$ is the partial solution of the wavefunction dependent on position. Applying the energy operator, we have
$$\hat{E} \Psi(\mathbf{r}, t) = i \hbar \frac{\partial}{\partial t} \psi(\mathbf{r}) e^{-iEt/\hbar} = i \hbar \left(\frac{-iE}{\hbar}\right) \psi(\mathbf{r}) e^{-iEt/\hbar} = E \psi(\mathbf{r}) e^{-iEt/\hbar} = E \Psi(\mathbf{r}, t).$$
This is also known as the stationary state, and can be used to analyse the time-independent Schrödinger equation:
$$E \Psi(\mathbf{r}, t) = \hat{H}\Psi(\mathbf{r}, t)$$
where E is an eigenvalue of energy.

=== Klein–Gordon equation ===
The relativistic mass-energy relation:
$$E^2 = (pc)^2 + (mc^2)^2$$
where again E = total energy, p = total 3-momentum of the particle, m = invariant mass, and c = speed of light, can similarly yield the Klein–Gordon equation:
$$\begin{align}
& \hat{E}^2 = c^2\hat{p}^2 + (mc^2)^2 \\
& \hat{E}^2\Psi = c^2\hat{p}^2\Psi + (mc^2)^2\Psi \\
\end{align}$$
where $\hat{p}$ is the momentum operator. That is:
$$\frac{\partial^2 \Psi}{\partial t^2} =  c^2\nabla^2\Psi - \left(\frac{mc^2}{\hbar}\right)^2\Psi$$

== Derivation ==
The energy operator is easily derived from using the free particle wave function (plane wave solution to Schrödinger's equation). Starting in one dimension the wave function is
$$\Psi = e^{i(kx-\omega t)}$$

The time derivative of Ψ is
$$\frac{\partial \Psi}{\partial t} = -i \omega e^{i(kx-\omega t)} = - i \omega \Psi .$$

By the De Broglie relation:
$$E=\hbar \omega ,$$
we have
$$\frac{\partial \Psi}{\partial t} = - i \frac{E}{\hbar} \Psi .$$

Re-arranging the equation leads to
$$E\Psi = i\hbar\frac{\partial \Psi}{\partial t} ,$$
where the energy factor E is a scalar value, the energy the particle has and the value that is measured. The partial derivative is a linear operator so this expression is the operator for energy:
$$\hat{E} = i\hbar\frac{\partial }{\partial t} .$$

It can be concluded that the scalar E is the eigenvalue of the operator, while $\hat{E}$ is the operator. Summarizing these results:
$$\hat{E}\Psi = i\hbar\frac{\partial }{\partial t}\Psi = E\Psi$$

For a plane wave travelling in the three-dimensional space in the direction of the wave vector $\mathbf{k}$,
$$\Psi = e^{i(\mathbf{k}\cdot\mathbf{r}-\omega t)},$$
the derivation is identical, as no change is made to the term including time and therefore the time derivative. Since the operator is linear, they are valid for any linear combination of plane waves, and so they can act on any wave function without affecting the properties of the wave function or operators. Hence this must be true for any wave function. It turns out to work even in relativistic quantum mechanics, such as the Klein–Gordon equation above.

== See also ==
- Time translation symmetry
- Planck constant
- Schrödinger equation
- Momentum operator
- Hamiltonian (quantum mechanics)
- Conservation of energy
- Complex number
- Stationary state
