= Valentine Bargmann =

German-American mathematician and physicist (1908–1989)

- Born: 6 April 1908; Berlin, Prussia, Germany
- Died: 20 July 1989 (aged 81); Princeton, New Jersey, US
- Education: University of Berlin
- Known for: Bargmann algebra Bargmann kernel Bargmann's limit Bargmann's theorem Bargmann–Wigner equations Bargmann–Michel–Telegdi equation Segal–Bargmann space Representation theory of SL2(R)
- Awards: Max Planck Medal (1988); Wigner Medal (1978)
- Scientific career
- Fields: Physics
- Workplaces: Princeton University
- Thesis: Über die durch Elektronenstrahlen in Kristallen angeregte Lichtemission (1937)
- Doctoral advisor: Gregor Wentzel

Valentine "Valya" Bargmann (April 6, 1908 – July 20, 1989) was a German-American mathematician and theoretical physicist.

== Biography ==
Born in Berlin, Germany, to a German Jewish family, Bargmann studied there from 1925 to 1933. After the National Socialist Machtergreifung, he moved to Switzerland to the University of Zürich where he received his Ph.D. under Gregor Wentzel.

He emigrated to the U.S., barely managing immigration acceptance, as his German passport was to be revoked with only two days of validity left.

At the Institute for Advanced Study in Princeton (1937–1946) he worked as an assistant to Albert Einstein, publishing with him and Peter Bergmann on classical five-dimensional Kaluza–Klein theory (1941). He taught at Princeton University from 1946 for the rest of his career.

He pioneered understanding of the irreducible unitary representations of SL_{2}(R) and the Lorentz group (1947). He further formulated the Bargmann–Wigner equations with Eugene Wigner (1948), for particles of arbitrary spin, building up on work of several theorists who pioneered quantum mechanics.

Bargmann's theorem (1954) on projective unitary representations of Lie groups gives a condition for when a projective unitary representation of a Lie group comes from an ordinary unitary representation of its universal cover.

Bargmann further discovered the Bargmann–Michel–Telegdi equation (1959) describing relativistic precession; Bargmann's limit of the maximum number of QM bound states of a potential (1952); the notion of Bargmann potentials for the radial Schrödinger equations with bound states but no non-trivial scattering, which play a basic role in the theory of Solitons, and the holomorphic representation in the Segal–Bargmann space (1961), including the Bargmann kernel.

Bargmann was elected a Fellow of the American Academy of Arts and Sciences in 1968. In 1978, he received the Wigner Medal, together with Wigner himself, in the founding year of the prize. In 1979, Bargmann was elected to the US National Academy of Sciences. In 1988, he received the Max Planck Medal of the German Physical Society.

He was also a talented pianist.

He died in Princeton in 1989.

== Selected bibliography ==
- 1934: "Über den Zusammenhang zwischen Semivektoren and Spinoren und die Reduktion der Diracgleichung für Semivektoren". Helv. Phys. Acta 7:57-82.
- 1936: "Zur Theorie des Wasserstoffatoms". Z. Phys. 99:576-82.
- 1937: "Über die durch Elektronenstrahlen in Kristallen angeregte Lichtemission". Helv. Phys. Acta 10:361-86.
- 1941: With A. Einstein and P. G. Bergmann. "On the five-dimensional representation of gravitation and electricity". In Theodore von Kármán Anniversary Volume, pp. 212–25,(Pasadena, California Institute of Technology).
- 1944: With A. Einstein. "Bivector fields". Ann. Math. 45:1-14.
- 1945: "On the glancing reflection of shock waves". Applied Mathematics Panel Report No. 108
- 1946: With D. Montgomery and J. von Neumann. "Solution of linear systems of high order". Report to the Bureau of Ordinance, U. S. Navy.
- 1947: "Irreducible unitary representations of the Lorentz group". Ann. Math. 48:568-640.
- 1948: With E. P. Wigner. "Group theoretical discussion of relativistic wave equations". Proc. Natl. Acad. Sci. U.S.A. 34:211-23.
- 1949: "Remarks on the determination of a central field of force from the elastic scattering phase shifts". Phys. Rev. 75:301-303.
- "On the connection between phase shifts and scattering potential". Rev. Mod. Phys. 21:488-93.
- 1952: "On the number of bound states in a central field of force". Proc. Natl. Acad. Sci. U.S.A. 38:961-66.
- 1954: "On unitary ray representations of continuous groups". Ann. Math. 59:1-46.
- 1959: With L. Michel and V. Telegdi. "Precession of the polarization of particles moving in a homogeneous electromagnetic field". Phys. Rev. Lett. 2:435-36.
- 1960: "Relativity". In Theoretical Physics in the Twentieth Century (Pauli Memorial Volume), eds., M. Fierz and V. F. Weisskopf, pp. 187–98. New York: Interscience Publishers.
- With M. Moshinsky. "Group theory of harmonic oscillators. I. The collective modes". Nucl. Phys. 18:697-712.
- 1961: With M. Moshinsky. "Group theory of harmonic oscillators. II. The integrals of motion for the quadrupole-quadrupole interaction". Nucl. Phys. 23:177-99.
- "On a Hilbert space of analytic functions and an associated integral transform. Part I." Commun. Pure Appl. Math. 14:187-214.
- 1962: "On the representations of the rotation group". Rev. Mod. Phys. 34:829-45.
- 1964: "Note on Wigner’s theorem on symmetry operations". J. Math. Phys. 5:862-68.
- 1967: "On a Hilbert space of analytic functions and an associated integral transform. Part II. A family of related function spaces application to distribution theory". Commun. Pure Appl. Math. 20:1-101.
- 1971: With P. Butera, L. Girardello, and J. R. Klauder. "On the completeness of the coherent states". Rep. Math. Phys. 2:221-28.
- 1972: "Notes on some integral inequalities". Helv. Phys. Acta 45:249-57.
- 1977: With I. T. Todorov. "Spaces of analytic functions on a complex cone as carriers for the symmetric tensor representations of SO(n)". J. Math. Phys. 18:1141-48.
- 1979: "Erinnerungen eines Assistanten Einsteins". Vierteljahrsschrift der Naturforschenden Gesellschaft in Zürich, Jahrgang 124, Heft 1, pp. 39–44. Zürich: Druck und Verlag Orell Fussli Graphische Betriebe AG.
