= Unitary transformation =

Endomorphism preserving the inner product

In mathematics, a unitary transformation is a linear isomorphism that preserves the inner product: the inner product of two vectors before the transformation is equal to their inner product after the transformation.

== Formal definition ==
More precisely, a unitary transformation is an isometric isomorphism between two inner product spaces (such as Hilbert spaces). In other words, a unitary transformation is a bijective function

$$U : H_1 \to H_2$$

between two inner product spaces, $H_1$ and $H_2,$ such that

$$\langle Ux, Uy \rangle_{H_2} = \langle x, y \rangle_{H_1} \quad \text{ for all } x, y \in H_1.$$

It is a linear isometry, as one can see by setting $x=y.$

== Unitary operator ==
In the case when $H_1$ and $H_2$ are the same space, a unitary transformation is an automorphism of that Hilbert space, and then it is also called a unitary operator.

== Relation to unitary matrices ==
In complex coordinate space $\Complex^n$ unitary transformations always have the shape

$$f \colon \Complex^n \to \Complex^n, \, x \mapsto U \cdot x$$,

where $U \in \Complex^{n \times n}$ is a unitary matrix, and the dot before the vector is the matrix-vector-product.

This matrix $U$ satisfies $UU^* = I$.

== Antiunitary transformation ==
A closely related notion is that of antiunitary transformation, which is a bijective function

$$U:H_1\to H_2\,$$

between two complex Hilbert spaces such that

$$\langle Ux, Uy \rangle = \overline{\langle x, y \rangle}=\langle y, x \rangle$$

for all $x$ and $y$ in $H_1$, where the horizontal bar represents the complex conjugate.

== See also ==
- Antiunitary
- Orthogonal transformation
- Time reversal
- Unitary group
- Unitary operator
- Unitary matrix
- Wigner's theorem
- Unitary transformations in quantum mechanics
