= Curtright =

Curtright may refer to:

- Thomas Curtright (born 1948), an American theoretical physicist
- Curtright field, a theoretical physics concept
- Curtright, Texas, an unincorporated community in Cass County, Texas

== See also ==
- Cartwright (disambiguation)
