= Wigner's theorem =

Theorem in the mathematical formulation of quantum mechanics

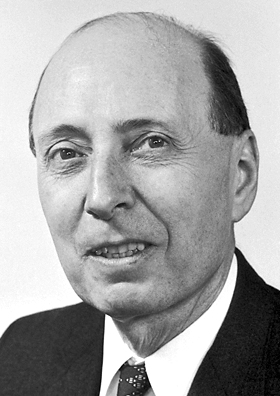
E.P. Wigner (1902–1995), ForMemRS, first proved the theorem bearing his name. It was a key step towards the modern classification scheme of particle types, according to which particle types are partly characterized by which representation of the Lorentz group under which it transforms. The Lorentz group is a symmetry group of every relativistic quantum field theory. Wigner's early work laid the ground for what many physicists came to call the group theory disease in quantum mechanics – or as Hermann Weyl (co-responsible) puts it in his The Theory of Groups and Quantum Mechanics (preface to 2nd ed.), "It has been rumored that the group pest is gradually being cut out from quantum mechanics. This is certainly not true…"

Wigner's theorem, proved by Eugene Wigner in 1931, is a cornerstone of the mathematical formulation of quantum mechanics. The theorem specifies how physical symmetries such as rotations, translations, and CPT transformations are represented on the Hilbert space of states.

The physical states in a quantum theory are represented by unit vectors in Hilbert space up to a phase factor, i.e. by the complex line or ray the vector spans. In addition, by the Born rule the absolute value of the unit vector's inner product with a unit eigenvector, or equivalently the cosine squared of the angle between the lines the vectors span, corresponds to the transition probability. Ray space, in mathematics known as projective Hilbert space, is the space of all unit vectors in Hilbert space up to the equivalence relation of differing by a phase factor. By Wigner's theorem, any transformation of ray space that preserves the absolute value of the inner products can be represented by a unitary or antiunitary transformation of Hilbert space, which is unique up to a phase factor. As a consequence, the representation of a symmetry group on ray space can be lifted to a projective representation or sometimes even an ordinary representation on Hilbert space.

== Rays and ray space ==
It is a postulate of quantum mechanics that state vectors in complex separable Hilbert space $H$ that are scalar nonzero multiples of each other represent the same pure state, i.e., the vectors $\Psi \in H \setminus \{0\}$ and $\lambda\Psi$, with $\lambda \in \mathbb{C} \setminus \{0\}$, represent the same state. By multiplying the state vectors with nonzero complex scalars, one obtains a set of vectors called the ray

$$\underline{\Psi} = \left\{\lambda \Psi : \lambda \in \mathbb{C} \setminus \{0\}\right\}.$$

Two nonzero vectors $\Psi_1, \Psi_2$ define the same ray, if and only if they differ by some nonzero complex number: $\Psi_1 = \lambda \Psi_2$. Alternatively, we can consider a ray $\underline \Psi$ as a set of vectors with norm 1, a unit ray, by intersecting the line $\underline \Psi$ with the unit sphere

$$SH = \{\Phi \in H \mid \|\Phi\|^2 = 1 \}$$.

Two unit vectors $\Psi_1, \Psi_2$ then define the same unit ray $\underline{\Psi_1} = \underline{\Psi_2}$ if they differ by a phase factor: $\Psi_1 = e^{i\alpha}\Psi_2$. This is the more usual picture in physics. The set of rays is in one to one correspondence with the set of unit rays and we can identify them. There is also a one-to-one correspondence between physical pure states $\rho$ and (unit) rays $\underline{\Phi}$ given by

$$\rho = P_{\Phi}= \frac{|\Phi\rangle\langle\Phi|}{\langle\Phi|\Phi\rangle}$$

where $P_{\Phi}$ is the orthogonal projection on the line $\underline{\Phi}$. In either interpretation, if $\Phi \in \underline{\Psi}$ or $P_{\Phi} = P_{\Psi}$ then $\Phi$ is a representative of $\underline{\Psi}$. (Note: Here the possibility of superselection rules is ignored. It may be the case that a system cannot be prepared in specific states. For instance, superposition of states with different spin is generally believed impossible. Likewise, states being superpositions of states with different charge are considered impossible. Minor complications due to those issues are treated in Bogoliubov, Logunov & Todorov (1975))

The space of all rays is a projective Hilbert space called the ray space. It can be defined in several ways. One may define an equivalence relation $\sim$ on $H \setminus \{0\}$ by

$$\Psi \sim\Phi \Leftrightarrow \Psi = \lambda\Phi,\quad \lambda \in \mathbb{C} \setminus \{0\},$$

and define ray space as the quotient set

$$\mathbf{P}(H)  = (H \setminus \{0\}) / {\sim}$$.

Alternatively, for an equivalence relation on the sphere $SH$, the unit ray space is an incarnation of ray space defined (making no notational distinction with ray space) as the set of equivalence classes

$$\mathbf{P}(H) = SH / \sim$$.

A third equivalent definition of ray space is as pure state ray space i.e. as density matrices that are orthogonal projections of rank 1

$$\mathbf{P}(H) = \{P\in B(H) \mid P^2 = P = P^\dagger, \mathbb{tr}(P) = 1 \}$$,

where $B(H)$ is the Banach space of bounded operators on $H$, $P^\dagger$ is the adjoint operator (equivalent to conjugate transpose if $H$ is finite dimensional), and $\mathbb{tr}(P)$ is the trace of P.

These conditions can be understood as $P=P^2$ means P is idempotent (projecting twice is the same as projecting once), $P =P^\dagger$ means $Px$ and $Px - x$ are orthogonal for any $x\in H$. Orthogonal projections have only 0 or 1 as possible eigenvalues, and in this context $\mathbb{tr}(P) = 1$ means the eigenspace for eigenvalue 1 is one-dimensional, implying P is a projection onto a one-dimensional subspace. This algebraic characterization is considered important, although equivalent to the others, as it establishes the space of rays is an algebraic variety.

If $H$ is n-dimensional, i.e., $H_n := H$, then $\mathbf{P}(H_n)$ is isomorphic to the complex projective space $\mathbb{C}\mathbf{P}^{n-1}=\mathbf{P}(\mathbb{C}^n)$. For example

$$\lambda_1 |+\rangle + \lambda_2 |-\rangle, \quad (\lambda_1, \lambda_2) \in \mathbb{C}^2 \setminus \{0\}$$

generate points on the Bloch sphere; isomorphic to the Riemann sphere $\mathbb{C}\mathbf{P}^1$.

Ray space (i.e. projective space) is not a vector space but rather a set of vector lines (vector subspaces of dimension one) in a vector space of dimension n + 1. For example, for every two vectors $\Psi_1, \Psi_2 \in H_2$ and ratio of complex numbers $(\lambda_1 : \lambda_2)$ (i.e. element of $\mathbb{C}\mathbf{P}^1$) there is a well defined ray $\underline{\lambda_1\Psi_1 + \lambda_2\Psi_2}$. As such, for distinct rays $\underline{\Psi}_1, \underline{\Psi}_2$ (i.e. linearly independent lines) there is a projective line of rays of the form $\underline{\lambda_1\Psi_1 + \lambda_2\Psi_2}$ in $\mathbf{P}(H_2)$: all 1-dimensional complex lines in the 2-dimensional complex plane spanned by $\Psi_1$ and $\Psi_2$. Contrarily to the case of vector spaces, however, an independent spanning set does not suffice for defining coordinates (see: projective frame).

The Hilbert space structure on $H$ defines additional structure on ray space. Define the ray correlation (or ray product)

$$\underline{\Psi} \cdot \underline{\Phi} = \frac{\left|\left\langle\Psi, \Phi\right\rangle\right|}{\|\Phi\|\|\Psi\|}
= \sqrt{\mathrm{tr}(P_{\Psi}P_{\Phi})},$$

where $\langle\, , \, \rangle$ is the Hilbert space inner product, and $\Psi, \Phi$ are representatives of $\underline{\Phi}$ and $\underline{\Psi}$. Note that the righthand side is independent of the choice of representatives. The physical significance of this definition is that according to the Born rule, another postulate of quantum mechanics, the transition probabilities between normalised states $\Psi$ and $\Phi$ in Hilbert space is given by

$$P(\Psi \rightarrow \Phi) = |\langle\Psi, \Phi\rangle|^2 = \left(\underline{\Psi} \cdot \underline{\Phi}\right)^2$$

i.e. we can define Born's rule on ray space by.

$$P(\underline{\Psi} \to \underline{\Phi}) := \left(\underline{\Psi} \cdot \underline{\Phi}\right)^2.$$

Geometrically, we can define an angle $\theta$ with $0 \le \theta\le \pi/2$ between the lines $\underline{\Phi}$ and $\underline{\Psi}$ by $\cos(\theta) = (\underline{\Psi} \cdot \underline{\Phi})$. The angle then turns out to satisfy the triangle inequality and defines a metric structure on ray space which comes from a Riemannian metric, the Fubini-Study metric.

== Symmetry transformations ==
Loosely speaking, a symmetry transformation is a change in which "nothing happens" or a "change in our point of view" that does not change the outcomes of possible experiments. For example, translating a system in a homogeneous environment should have no qualitative effect on the outcomes of experiments made on the system. Likewise for rotating a system in an isotropic environment. This becomes even clearer when one considers the mathematically equivalent passive transformations, i.e. simply changes of coordinates and let the system be. Usually, the domain and range Hilbert spaces are the same. An exception would be (in a non-relativistic theory) the Hilbert space of electron states that is subjected to a charge conjugation transformation. In this case the electron states are mapped to the Hilbert space of positron states and vice versa. However this means that the symmetry acts on the direct sum of the Hilbert spaces.

A transformation of a physical system is a transformation of states, hence mathematically a transformation, not of the Hilbert space, but of its ray space. Hence, in quantum mechanics, a transformation of a physical system gives rise to a bijective ray transformation $T$

$$\begin{align}
T: \mathbf{P}(H) &\to \mathbf{P}(H)\\
\underline{\Psi} &\mapsto  T\underline{\Psi}.\\
\end{align}$$

Since the composition of two physical transformations and the reversal of a physical transformation are also physical transformations, and since the composition is associative, the set of all ray transformations so obtained is a group acting on $\mathbf{P}(H)$. Not all bijections of $\mathbf{P}(H)$ are permissible as symmetry transformations, however. Physical transformations must preserve Born's rule.

For a physical transformation, the transition probabilities in the transformed and untransformed systems should be preserved:

$$P(\underline{\Psi} \rightarrow \underline{\Phi}) =  \left(\underline{\Psi} \cdot \underline{\Phi}\right)^2 = \left(T\underline{\Psi} \cdot T\underline{\Phi}\right)^2 =  P\left(T\Psi \rightarrow T\Phi \right)$$

A bijective ray transformation $T : \mathbf{P}(H) \to \mathbf{P}(H)$ is called a symmetry transformation iff:$T \underline{\Psi} \cdot T\underline{\Phi} = \underline{\Psi} \cdot \underline{\Phi},\quad \forall \underline\Psi, \underline\Phi \in \mathbf{P}(H)$. A geometric interpretation is that a symmetry transformation is an isometry of ray space.

Some facts about symmetry transformations that can be verified using the definition:

- The product of two symmetry transformations, i.e. two symmetry transformations applied in succession, is a symmetry transformation.
- Any symmetry transformation has an inverse.
- The identity transformation is a symmetry transformation.
- Multiplication of symmetry transformations is associative.

The set of symmetry transformations thus forms a group, the symmetry group of the system. Some important frequently occurring subgroups in the symmetry group of a system are realizations of

- The symmetric group with its subgroups. This is important on the exchange of particle labels.
- The Poincaré group. It encodes the fundamental isometries of spacetime – space-time translations and Lorentz transformations
- Internal symmetry groups like SU(2) and SU(3). They describe so called internal symmetries, like isospin and color charge peculiar to quantum mechanical systems.

These groups are also referred to as symmetry groups of the system.

== Statement of Wigner's theorem ==
=== Preliminaries ===
Some preliminary definitions are needed to state the theorem. A transformation $U: H \to K$ between Hilbert spaces is unitary if it is bijective and

$$\langle U \Psi, U \Phi\rangle = \langle \Psi, \Phi \rangle$$

for all $\Psi, \Phi$ in $H$. If $H=K$ then $U$ reduces to a unitary operator whose inverse is equal to its adjoint $U^{-1} = U^\dagger$.

Likewise, a transformation $A:H \to K$ is antiunitary if it is bijective and

$$\langle A \Psi, A \Phi\rangle = \langle\Psi, \Phi\rangle^* = \langle\Phi, \Psi\rangle.$$

Given a unitary transformation $U:H \to K$ between Hilbert spaces, define

$$\begin{align}
T_U: \mathbf{P}(H) &\to \mathbf{P}(K) \\
\underline{\Psi} &\mapsto \underline{U\Psi}\\
\end{align}$$

This is a symmetry transformation since
$$T_U\underline{\Psi} \cdot T_U\underline{\Phi}  =
\frac{ \left|\langle U\Psi, U\Phi \rangle\right|}{\|U\Psi\|\|U\Phi\|} = \frac{\left|\langle\Psi, \Phi\rangle\right|}{\|\Psi\|\|\Phi\|}
= \underline{\Psi} \cdot \underline{\Phi}.$$

In the same way, an antiunitary transformation between Hilbert space induces a symmetry transformation. One says that a transformation $U:H \to K$ between Hilbert spaces is compatible with the transformation $T:\mathbf{P}(H) \to \mathbf{P}(K)$ between ray spaces if $T = T_U$ or equivalently

$$U\Psi \in T \underline \Psi$$

for all $\Psi \in H \setminus \{0\}$.

=== Statement ===
Every unitary or antiunitary transformation $V\colon H \to K$ induces a symmetry transformation $T : \mathbf{P}(H) \to \mathbf{P}(K)$. Wigner's theorem states the converse: every symmetry transformation is induced in this way.

Wigner's theorem (1931)—If $H$ and $K$ are Hilbert spaces and if $T:\mathbf{P}(H) \to \mathbf{P}(K)$ is a symmetry transformation, then there exists a unitary or antiunitary transformation $V: H \to K$ which is compatible with $T$.

Moreover, if $\dim(H) \geq 2$, then $V$ is unique up to a phase factor: any other transformation $V'\colon H \to K$ compatible with $T$ satisfies $V' = e^{i\varphi}V$ for some $\varphi \in \mathbb{R}$. In particular, whether $V$ is unitary or antiunitary is determined by $T$.

If $\dim(H) = 1$, then $\mathbf{P}(H)$ consists of a single point, and uniqueness fails. For instance, if also $\dim(K) = 1$, then every unitary and every antiunitary transformation $H \to K$ is compatible with $T$. Two compatible transformations of the same type differ by a phase factor, but a unitary and an antiunitary one do not. For example, for $H = K = \mathbb{C}$, both $z \mapsto z$ and $z \mapsto \bar{z}$ are compatible with $T$, but $\bar{z} \neq e^{i\alpha}z$ for every $\alpha \in \mathbb{R}$.

Proofs can be found in Wigner (1931, 1959), Uhlhorn (1963), Bargmann (1964) and Weinberg (2002). Antiunitary transformations are less prominent in physics. They are all related to a reversal of the direction of the flow of time.

Remark 1: The significance of the uniqueness part of the theorem is that it specifies the degree of uniqueness of the representation on $H$. For example, one might be tempted to believe that

$$V\Psi = Ue^{i\alpha(\Psi)}\Psi, \alpha(\Psi) \in \mathbb{R}, \Psi \in H \quad (\text{wrong unless }  \alpha(\Psi) \text{ is const.})$$

would be admissible, with $\alpha(\Psi) \ne \alpha(\Phi)$ for $\langle \Psi, \Phi \rangle = 0$ but this is not the case according to the theorem. (Note: There is an exception to this. If a superselection rule is in effect, then the phase may depend on in which sector of $H$ the element $\Psi$ resides, see Weinberg 2002, p. 53) In fact such a $V$ would not be additive.

Remark 2: Whether $T$ must be represented by a unitary or antiunitary operator is determined by topology. If $\dim_{\mathbb{C}}(\mathbb{P}H) = \dim_{\mathbb{C}}(\mathbb{P}K) \ge 1$, the second cohomology $H^2(\mathbb{P}H)$ has a unique generator $c_{\mathbb{P}H}$ such that for a (equivalently for every) complex projective line $L \subset \mathbb{P}H$, one has $c_{\mathbb{P}H} \cap [L] = \deg_L(c_{\mathbb{P}H}|_L) = 1$. Since $T$ is a homeomorphism, $T^*c_{\mathbb{P}K}$ also generates $H^2(\mathbb{P}H)$ and so we have $T^*c_{\mathbb{P}K} = \pm c_{\mathbb{P}H}$. If $U:H \to K$ is unitary, then $T_U^*c_{\mathbb{P}K} = c_{\mathbb{P}H}$ while if $A:H \to K$ is anti linear then $T_A^*c_{\mathbb{P}K} = -c_{\mathbb{P}H}$.

Remark 3: Wigner's theorem is in close connection with the fundamental theorem of projective geometry,

== Representations and projective representations ==
If G is a symmetry group (in this latter sense of being embedded as a subgroup of the symmetry group of the system acting on ray space), and if f, g, h ∈ G with fg = h, then

$$T(f)T(g) = T(h),$$

where the T are ray transformations. From the uniqueness part of Wigner's theorem, one has for the compatible representatives U,

$$U(f)U(g) = \omega(f, g)U(fg) = e^{i\xi(f, g)}U(fg),$$

where ω(f, g) is a phase factor. (Note: Again there is an exception. If a superselection rule is in effect, then the phase may depend on in which sector of H h resides on which the operators act, see Weinberg 2002, p. 53)

The function ω is called a 2-cocycle or Schur multiplier. A map U:G → GL(V) satisfying the above relation for some vector space V is called a projective representation or a ray representation. If ω(f, g) = 1, then it is called a representation.

The terminology differs between mathematics and physics. In the linked article, term projective representation has a slightly different meaning, but the term as presented here enters as an ingredient and the mathematics per se is of course the same. If the realization of the symmetry group, g → T(g), is given in terms of action on the space of unit rays S = PH, then it is a projective representation G → PGL(H) in the mathematical sense, while its representative on Hilbert space is a projective representation G → GL(H) in the physical sense.

Applying the last relation (several times) to the product fgh and appealing to the known associativity of multiplication of operators on H, one finds

$$\begin{align}
\omega(f, g)\omega(fg, h) &= \omega(g, h)\omega(f, gh), \\
\xi(f, g) + \xi(fg, h) &= \xi(g, h) + \xi(f, gh) \quad (\operatorname{mod} 2\pi).
\end{align}$$

They also satisfy

$$\begin{align}
\omega(g, e) &= \omega(e, g) = 1, \\
\xi(g, e) &= \xi(e, g) = 0 \quad (\operatorname{mod} 2\pi), \\
\omega\left(g, g^{-1}\right) &= \omega(g^{-1}, g), \\
\xi\left(g, g^{-1}\right) &= \xi(g^{-1}, g). \\
\end{align}$$

Upon redefinition of the phases,

$$U(g) \mapsto \hat{U}(g) = \eta(g)U(g) = e^{i\zeta(g)}U(g),$$

which is allowed by last theorem, one finds

$$\begin{align}
\hat{\omega}(g, h) &= \omega(g, h)\eta(g)\eta(h)\eta(gh)^{-1},\\
\hat{\xi}(g, h) &= \xi(g, h) + \zeta(g) + \zeta(h) - \zeta(gh) \quad (\operatorname{mod} 2\pi),\end{align}$$

where the hatted quantities are defined by

$$\hat{U}(f)\hat{U}(g) = \hat{\omega}(f, g)\hat{U}(fg) = e^{i\hat{\xi}(f,g)}\hat{U}(fg).$$

=== Utility of phase freedom ===
The following rather technical theorems and many more can be found, with accessible proofs, in Bargmann (1954).

The freedom of choice of phases can be used to simplify the phase factors. For some groups the phase can be eliminated altogether.

Theorem—If G is semisimple and simply connected, then ω(g, h) = 1 is possible.

In the case of the Lorentz group and its subgroup the rotation group SO(3), phases can, for projective representations, be chosen such that ω(g, h) = ± 1. For their respective universal covering groups, SL(2,C) and Spin(3), it is according to the theorem possible to have ω(g, h) = 1, i.e. they are proper representations.

The study of redefinition of phases involves group cohomology. Two functions related as the hatted and non-hatted versions of ω above are said to be cohomologous. They belong to the same second cohomology class, i.e. they are represented by the same element in H^{2}(G), the second cohomology group of G. If an element of H^{2}(G) contains the trivial function ω = 0, then it is said to be trivial. The topic can be studied at the level of Lie algebras and Lie algebra cohomology as well.

Assuming the projective representation g → T(g) is weakly continuous, two relevant theorems can be stated. An immediate consequence of (weak) continuity is that the identity component is represented by unitary operators. (Note: This is made plausible as follows. In an open neighborhood in the vicinity of the identity all operators can be expressed as squares. Whether an operator is unitary or antiunitary its square is unitary. Hence they are all unitary in a sufficiently small neighborhood. Such a neighborhood generates the identity.)

Theorem: (Wigner 1939)—The phase freedom can be used such that in a some neighborhood of the identity the map g → U(g) is strongly continuous.

Theorem (Bargmann)—In a sufficiently small neighborhood of e, the choice ω(g_{1}, g_{2}) ≡ 1 is possible for semisimple Lie groups (such as SO(n), SO(3,1) and affine linear groups, (in particular the Poincaré group). More precisely, this is exactly the case when the second cohomology group H^{2}(g, R) of the Lie algebra g of G is trivial.

== Modifications and generalizations ==
Wigner's theorem applies to automorphisms on the Hilbert space of pure states. Theorems by Kadison and Simon apply to the space of mixed states (trace-class positive operators) and use slight different notions of symmetry.

== See also ==
- Particle physics and representation theory
