= Curtright, Texas =

Unincorporated community in Texas, US

Coordinates: 33.1935°N 94.4651°W

Curtright, also known as White Sulfur Springs, is an unincorporated community in Cass County, Texas, United States. It is 15 miles (24 km) from Linden. It was founded in 1860 as White Sulfur Springs and renamed to Curtright in 1887. It had a post office from 1875 to 1890. By 1936, Curtright was a dispersed community.
