= Unitary operator =

Surjective bounded operator on a Hilbert space preserving the inner product

In functional analysis, a unitary operator is a surjective bounded operator on a Hilbert space that preserves the inner product. Non-trivial examples include rotations, reflections, and the Fourier operator. Unitary operators generalize unitary matrices. Unitary operators are usually taken as operating on a Hilbert space, but the same notion serves to define the concept of isomorphism between Hilbert spaces.

== Definition ==
Definition 1. A unitary operator is a bounded linear operator U : H → H on a Hilbert space H that satisfies U*U = UU* = I, where U* is the adjoint of U, and I : H → H is the identity operator.

The weaker condition U*U = I defines an isometry. The other weaker condition, UU* = I, defines a coisometry. Thus a unitary operator is a bounded linear operator that is both an isometry and a coisometry, or, equivalently, a surjective isometry.

An equivalent definition is the following:

Definition 2. A unitary operator is a bounded linear operator U : H → H on a Hilbert space H for which the following hold:

- U is surjective, and
- U preserves the inner product of the Hilbert space, H. In other words, for all vectors x and y in H we have:
  $$\langle Ux, Uy \rangle_H = \langle x, y \rangle_H.$$

The notion of isomorphism in the category of Hilbert spaces is captured if domain and range are allowed to differ in this definition. Isometries preserve Cauchy sequences; hence the completeness property of Hilbert spaces is preserved

The following, seemingly weaker, definition is also equivalent:

Definition 3. A unitary operator is a bounded linear operator U : H → H on a Hilbert space H for which the following hold:

- the range of U is dense in H, and
- U preserves the inner product of the Hilbert space, H. In other words, for all vectors x and y in H we have:
  $$\langle Ux, Uy \rangle_H = \langle x, y \rangle_H.$$

To see that definitions 1 and 3 are equivalent, notice that U preserving the inner product implies U is an isometry (thus, a bounded linear operator). The fact that U has dense range ensures it has a bounded inverse U^{−1}. It is clear that U^{−1} = U*.

Thus, unitary operators are just automorphisms of Hilbert spaces, i.e., they preserve the structure (the vector space structure, the inner product, and hence the topology) of the space on which they act. The group of all unitary operators from a given Hilbert space H to itself is sometimes referred to as the Hilbert group of H, denoted Hilb(H) or U(H).

== Examples ==
- The identity function is trivially a unitary operator.
- Rotations in R^{2} are the simplest nontrivial example of unitary operators. Rotations do not change the length of a vector or the angle between two vectors. This example can be expanded to R^{3}. In even higher dimensions, this can be extended to the Givens rotation.
- Reflections, like the Householder transformation.
- $\frac{1}{\sqrt{n}}$ times a Hadamard matrix.
- In general, any operator in a Hilbert space that acts by permuting an orthonormal basis is unitary. In the finite dimensional case, such operators are the permutation matrices.
- On the vector space C of complex numbers, multiplication by a number of absolute value 1, that is, a number of the form e^{iθ} for θ ∈ R, is a unitary operator. θ is referred to as a phase, and this multiplication is referred to as multiplication by a phase. Notice that the value of θ modulo 2π does not affect the result of the multiplication, and so the independent unitary operators on C are parametrized by a circle. The corresponding group, which, as a set, is the circle, is called U(1).
- The Fourier operator is a unitary operator, i.e. the operator that performs the Fourier transform (with proper normalization). This follows from Parseval's theorem.
- Quantum logic gates are unitary operators. Not all gates are Hermitian.
- More generally, unitary matrices are precisely the unitary operators on finite-dimensional Hilbert spaces, so the notion of a unitary operator is a generalization of the notion of a unitary matrix. Orthogonal matrices are the special case of unitary matrices in which all entries are real. They are the unitary operators on R^{n}.
- The bilateral shift on the sequence space ℓ^{2} indexed by the integers is unitary.
- The unilateral shift (right shift) is an isometry; its conjugate (left shift) is a coisometry.
- Unitary operators are used in unitary representations.
- A unitary element is a generalization of a unitary operator. In a unital algebra, an element U of the algebra is called a unitary element if U*U = UU* = I, where I is the multiplicative identity element.
- Any composition of the above.

== Linearity ==
The linearity requirement in the definition of a unitary operator can be dropped without changing the meaning because it can be derived from linearity and positive-definiteness of the scalar product:

$$\begin{align}
\| \lambda U(x) -U(\lambda x) \|^2 &= \langle \lambda U(x) -U(\lambda x), \lambda U(x)-U(\lambda x) \rangle \\[5pt]
&= \| \lambda U(x) \|^2 + \| U(\lambda x) \|^2 - \langle U(\lambda x), \lambda  U(x) \rangle - \langle \lambda U(x), U(\lambda  x) \rangle \\[5pt]
&= |\lambda|^2 \| U(x)\|^2 + \| U(\lambda x) \|^2 - \overline{\lambda} \langle U(\lambda x), U(x) \rangle - \lambda  \langle U(x), U(\lambda x) \rangle \\[5pt]
&= |\lambda|^2 \| x \|^2 + \| \lambda x \|^2 - \overline{\lambda} \langle \lambda x, x \rangle - \lambda \langle x, \lambda x \rangle \\[5pt]
&= 0
\end{align}$$

Analogously we obtain

$$\| U(x+y)-(Ux+Uy)\| = 0.$$

== Properties ==
- The spectrum of a unitary operator U lies on the unit circle. That is, for any complex number λ in the spectrum, one has |λ| = 1. This can be seen as a consequence of the spectral theorem for normal operators. By the theorem, U is unitarily equivalent to multiplication by a Borel-measurable f on L^{2}(μ), for some finite measure space (X, μ). Now UU* = I implies |f(x)|^{2} = 1, μ-a.e. This shows that the essential range of f, therefore the spectrum of U, lies on the unit circle.
- A linear map is unitary if it is surjective and isometric. (Use Polarization identity to show the only if part.)

== See also ==
- Antiunitary – Bijective antilinear map between two complex Hilbert spaces
- Crinkled arc
- Quantum logic gate – Basic circuit in quantum computing
- Unitary matrix – Complex matrix whose conjugate transpose equals its inverse
- Unitary transformation – Endomorphism preserving the inner product
