= Antiunitary operator =

Bijective antilinear map between two complex Hilbert spaces

In mathematics, an antiunitary transformation is a bijective antilinear map

$$U: H_1 \to H_2\,$$

between two complex Hilbert spaces such that

$$\langle Ux, Uy \rangle = \overline{\langle x, y \rangle}$$

for all $x$ and $y$ in $H_1$, where the horizontal bar represents the complex conjugate. If additionally one has $H_1 = H_2$ then $U$ is called an antiunitary operator.

Antiunitary operators are important in quantum mechanics because they are used to represent certain symmetries, such as time reversal. Their fundamental importance in quantum physics is further demonstrated by Wigner's theorem.

== Invariance transformations ==
In quantum mechanics, the invariance transformations of complex Hilbert space $H$ leave the absolute value of scalar product invariant:

$$|\langle Tx, Ty \rangle| = |\langle x, y \rangle|$$

for all $x$ and $y$ in $H$.

Due to Wigner's theorem these transformations can either be unitary or antiunitary.

=== Geometric Interpretation ===
Congruences of the plane form two distinct classes. The first conserves the orientation and is generated by translations and rotations. The second does not conserve the orientation and is obtained from the first class by applying a reflection. On the complex plane these two classes correspond (up to translation) to unitaries and antiunitaries, respectively.

== Properties ==
- $\langle Ux, Uy \rangle = \overline{\langle x, y \rangle} = \langle y, x \rangle$ holds for all elements $x, y$ of the Hilbert space and an antiunitary $U$.
- When $U$ is antiunitary then $U^2$ is unitary. This follows from
  $$\left\langle U^2 x, U^2 y \right\rangle = \overline{\langle Ux, Uy \rangle} = \langle x, y \rangle .$$
- For unitary operator $V$ the operator $VK$, where $K$ is complex conjugation (with respect to some orthogonal basis), is antiunitary. The reverse is also true, for antiunitary $U$ the operator $UK$ is unitary.
- For antiunitary $U$ the definition of the adjoint operator $U^*$ is changed to compensate the complex conjugation, becoming
  $$\langle U x,y\rangle = \overline{\left\langle x, U^*y\right\rangle}.$$
- The adjoint of an antiunitary $U$ is also antiunitary and
  $$U U^* = U^* U = 1.$$
  (This is not to be confused with the definition of unitary operators, as the antiunitary operator $U$ is not complex linear.)

== Examples ==
- The complex conjugation operator $K,$ $K z = \overline{z},$ is an antiunitary operator on the complex plane.
- The operator
  $$U = i \sigma_y K = \begin{pmatrix}
0 & 1 \\
-1 & 0
\end{pmatrix} K,$$
  where $\sigma_y$ is the second Pauli matrix and $K$ is the complex conjugation operator, is antiunitary. It satisfies $U^2 = -1$.

== Decomposition of an antiunitary operator into a direct sum of elementary Wigner antiunitaries ==
An antiunitary operator on a finite-dimensional space may be decomposed as a direct sum of elementary Wigner antiunitaries $W_\theta$, $0 \le \theta \le \pi$. The operator $W_0:\Complex \to \Complex$ is just simple complex conjugation on $\mathbb{C}$

$$W_0(z) = \overline{z}$$

For $0 < \theta \le \pi$, the operator $W_\theta$ acts on two-dimensional complex Hilbert space. It is defined by

$$W_\theta\left(\left(z_1, z_2\right)\right) = \left(e^{\frac{i}{2}\theta} \overline{z_2},\; e^{-\frac{i}{2}\theta}\overline{z_1}\right).$$

Note that for $0 < \theta \le \pi$

$$W_\theta\left(W_\theta\left(\left(z_1, z_2\right)\right)\right) = \left(e^{i\theta}z_1, e^{-i\theta}z_2\right),$$

so such $W_\theta$ may not be further decomposed into $W_0$'s, which square to the identity map.

Note that the above decomposition of antiunitary operators contrasts with the spectral decomposition of unitary operators. In particular, a unitary operator on a complex Hilbert space may be decomposed into a direct sum of unitaries acting on 1-dimensional complex spaces (eigenspaces), but an antiunitary operator may only be decomposed into a direct sum of elementary operators on 1- and 2-dimensional complex spaces.

== See also ==
- Unitary operator
- Wigner's Theorem
- Particle physics and representation theory
