= Littelmann path model =

In mathematics, the Littelmann path model is a combinatorial device due to Peter Littelmann for computing multiplicities without overcounting in the representation theory of symmetrisable Kac–Moody algebras. Its most important application is to complex semisimple Lie algebras or equivalently compact semisimple Lie groups, the case described in this article. Multiplicities in irreducible representations, tensor products and branching rules can be calculated using a coloured directed graph, with labels given by the simple roots of the Lie algebra.

Developed as a bridge between the theory of crystal bases arising from the work of Kashiwara and Lusztig on quantum groups and the standard monomial theory of C. S. Seshadri and Lakshmibai, Littelmann's path model associates to each irreducible representation a rational vector space with basis given by paths from the origin to a weight as well as a pair of root operators acting on paths for each simple root. This gives a direct way of recovering the algebraic and combinatorial structures previously discovered by Kashiwara and Lusztig using quantum groups.

== Background and motivation ==
Some of the basic questions in the representation theory of complex semisimple Lie algebras or compact semisimple Lie groups going back to Hermann Weyl include:

- For a given dominant weight λ, find the weight multiplicities in the irreducible representation L(λ) with highest weight λ.
- For two highest weights λ, μ, find the decomposition of their tensor product L(λ) $\otimes$ L(μ) into irreducible representations.
- Suppose that $\mathfrak{g}_1$ is the Levi component of a parabolic subalgebra of a semisimple Lie algebra $\mathfrak{g}$. For a given dominant highest weight λ, determine the branching rule for decomposing the restriction of L(λ) to $\mathfrak{g}_1$.

(Note that the first problem, of weight multiplicities, is the special case of the third in which the parabolic subalgebra is a Borel subalgebra. Moreover, the Levi branching problem can be embedded in the tensor product problem as a certain limiting case.)

Answers to these questions were first provided by Hermann Weyl and Richard Brauer as consequences of explicit character formulas, followed by later combinatorial formulas of Hans Freudenthal, Robert Steinberg and Bertram Kostant; see Humphreys (1994). An unsatisfactory feature of these formulas is that they involved alternating sums for quantities that were known a priori to be non-negative. Littelmann's method expresses these multiplicities as sums of non-negative integers without overcounting. His work generalizes classical results based on Young tableaux for the general linear Lie algebra $\mathfrak{gl}$_{n} or the special linear Lie algebra $\mathfrak{sl}$_{n}:

- Issai Schur's result in his 1901 dissertation that the weight multiplicities could be counted in terms of column-strict Young tableaux (i.e. weakly increasing to the right along rows, and strictly increasing down columns).
- The celebrated Littlewood–Richardson rule that describes both tensor product decompositions and branching from $\mathfrak{gl}$_{m+n} to $\mathfrak{gl}$_{m} $\oplus$ $\mathfrak{gl}$_{n} in terms of lattice permutations of skew tableaux.

Attempts at finding similar algorithms without overcounting for the other classical Lie algebras had only been partially successful.

Littelmann's contribution was to give a unified combinatorial model that applied to all symmetrizable Kac–Moody algebras and provided explicit subtraction-free combinatorial formulas for weight multiplicities, tensor product rules and branching rules. He accomplished this by introducing the vector space V over Q generated by the weight lattice of a Cartan subalgebra; on the vector space of piecewise-linear paths in V connecting the origin to a weight, he defined a pair of root operators for each simple root of $\mathfrak{g}$. The combinatorial data could be encoded in a coloured directed graph, with labels given by the simple roots.

Littelmann's main motivation was to reconcile two different aspects of representation theory:

- The standard monomial theory of Lakshmibai and Seshadri arising from the geometry of Schubert varieties.
- Crystal bases arising in the approach to quantum groups of Masaki Kashiwara and George Lusztig. Kashiwara and Lusztig constructed canonical bases for representations of deformations of the universal enveloping algebra of $\mathfrak{g}$ depending on a formal deformation parameter q. In the degenerate case when q = 0, these yield crystal bases together with pairs of operators corresponding to simple roots; see Ariki (2002).

Although differently defined, the crystal basis, its root operators and crystal graph were later shown to be equivalent to Littelmann's path model and graph; see Hong & Kang (2002, p. xv). In the case of complex semisimple Lie algebras, there is a simplified self-contained account in Littelmann (1997) relying only on the properties of root systems; this approach is followed here.

== Definitions ==
Let P be the weight lattice in the dual of a Cartan subalgebra of the semisimple Lie algebra $\mathfrak{g}$.

A Littelmann path is a piecewise-linear mapping

$$\pi:[0,1]\cap \mathbf{Q} \rightarrow  P\otimes_{\mathbf{Z}}\mathbf{Q}$$

such that π(0) = 0 and π(1) is a weight.

Let (H_{α}) be the basis of $\mathfrak{h}$ consisting of "coroot" vectors, dual to basis of $\mathfrak{h}$* formed by simple roots (α). For fixed α and a path π, the function $h(t)= (\pi(t), H_\alpha)$ has a minimum value M.

Define non-decreasing self-mappings l and r of [0,1] $\cap$ Q by

$$l(t) = \min_{t\le s\le 1} (1,h(s)-M),\,\,\,\,\,\, r(t) = 1 - \min_{0\le s\le t} (1,h(s)-M).$$

Thus l(t) = 0 until the last time that h(s) = M and r(t) = 1 after the first time that h(s) = M.

Define new paths π_{l} and π_{r} by

$$\pi_r(t)= \pi(t) + r(t) \alpha,\,\,\,\,\,\, \pi_l(t) = \pi(t) - l(t)\alpha$$

The root operators e_{α} and f_{α} are defined on a basis vector [π] by

- $\displaystyle{ e_\alpha [\pi] = [\pi_r]}$ if r (0) = 0 and 0 otherwise;
- $\displaystyle{f_\alpha [\pi] = [\pi_l]}$ if l (1) = 1 and 0 otherwise.

The key feature here is that the paths form a basis for the root operators like that of a monomial representation: when a root operator is applied to the basis element for a path, the result is either 0 or the basis element for another path.

== Properties ==
Let $\mathcal{A}$ be the algebra generated by the root operators. Let π(t) be a path lying wholly within the positive Weyl chamber defined by the simple roots. Using results on the path model of C. S. Seshadri and Lakshmibai, Littelmann showed that

- the $\mathcal{A}$-module generated by [π] depends only on π(1) = λ and has a Q-basis consisting of paths [σ];
- the multiplicity of the weight μ in the integrable highest weight representation L(λ) is the number of paths σ with σ(1) = μ.

There is also an action of the Weyl group on paths [π]. If α is a simple root and k = h(1), with h as above, then the corresponding reflection s_{α} acts as follows:

- s_{α} [π] = [π] if k = 0;
- s_{α} [π]= f_{α}^{k} [π] if k > 0;
- s_{α} [π]= e_{α}^{– k} [π] if k < 0.

If π is a path lying wholly inside the positive Weyl chamber, the Littelmann graph $\mathcal{G}_\pi$ is defined to be the coloured, directed graph having as vertices the non-zero paths obtained by successively applying the operators f_{α} to π. There is a directed arrow from one path to another labelled by the simple root α, if the target path is obtained from the source path by applying f_{α}.

- The Littelmann graphs of two paths are isomorphic as coloured, directed graphs if and only if the paths have the same end point.

The Littelmann graph therefore only depends on λ. Kashiwara and Joseph proved that it coincides with the "crystal graph" defined by Kashiwara in the theory of crystal bases.

== Applications ==
=== Character formula ===
If π(1) = λ, the multiplicity of the weight μ in L(λ) is the number of vertices σ in the Littelmann graph $\mathcal{G}_\pi$ with σ(1) = μ.

=== Generalized Littlewood–Richardson rule ===
Let π and σ be paths in the positive Weyl chamber with π(1) = λ and σ(1) = μ. Then

$$L(\lambda) \otimes L(\mu) = \bigoplus_\eta L(\lambda + \tau(1)),$$

where τ ranges over paths in $\mathcal{G}_\sigma$ such that π $\star$ τ lies entirely in the positive Weyl chamber and the concatenation π $\star$ τ (t) is defined as π(2t) for t ≤ 1/2 and π(1) + τ( 2t – 1) for t ≥ 1/2.

=== Branching rule ===
If $\mathfrak{g}_1$ is the Levi component of a parabolic subalgebra of $\mathfrak{g}$ with weight lattice P_{1} $\supset$ P then

$$L(\lambda)|_{\mathfrak{g}_1} = \bigoplus_{\sigma} L_{\mathfrak{g}_1}(\sigma(1)),$$

where the sum ranges over all paths σ in $\mathcal{G}_\pi$ which lie wholly in the positive Weyl chamber for $\mathfrak{g}_1$.

== See also ==
- Crystal basis
