= Generalized Verma module =

In mathematics, generalized Verma modules are a generalization of a (true) Verma module, and are objects in the representation theory of Lie algebras. They were studied originally by James Lepowsky in the 1970s. The motivation for their study is that their homomorphisms correspond to invariant differential operators over generalized flag manifolds. The study of these operators is an important part of the theory of parabolic geometries.

== Definition ==
Let $\mathfrak{g}$ be a semisimple Lie algebra and $\mathfrak{p}$ a parabolic subalgebra of $\mathfrak{g}$. For any irreducible finite-dimensional representation $V$ of $\mathfrak{p}$ we define the generalized Verma module to be the relative tensor product

$$M_{\mathfrak{p}}(V):=\mathcal{U}(\mathfrak{g})\otimes_{\mathcal{U}(\mathfrak{p})} V$$.

The action of $\mathfrak{g}$ is left multiplication in $\mathcal{U}(\mathfrak{g})$.

If λ is the highest weight of V, we sometimes denote the Verma module by $M_{\mathfrak{p}}(\lambda)$.

Note that $M_{\mathfrak{p}}(\lambda)$ makes sense only for $\mathfrak{p}$-dominant and $\mathfrak{p}$-integral weights (see weight) $\lambda$.

It is well known that a parabolic subalgebra $\mathfrak{p}$ of $\mathfrak{g}$ determines a unique grading $\mathfrak{g}=\oplus_{j=-k}^k \mathfrak{g}_j$ so that $\mathfrak{p}=\oplus_{j \geq 0} \mathfrak{g}_j$. Let $\mathfrak{g}_-:=\oplus_{j<0} \mathfrak{g}_j$. It follows from the Poincaré–Birkhoff–Witt theorem that, as a vector space (and even as a $\mathfrak{g}_-$-module and as a $\mathfrak{g}_0$-module),

$$M_{\mathfrak{p}}(V)\simeq \mathcal{U}(\mathfrak{g}_-)\otimes V$$.

In further text, we will denote a generalized Verma module simply by GVM.

== Properties of GVMs ==
GVM's are highest weight modules and their highest weight λ is the highest weight of the representation V. If $v_\lambda$ is the highest weight vector in V, then $1\otimes v_\lambda$ is the highest weight vector in $M_{\mathfrak{p}}(\lambda)$.

GVM's are weight modules, i.e. they are direct sum of its weight spaces and these weight spaces are finite-dimensional.

As all highest weight modules, GVM's are quotients of Verma modules. The kernel of the projection $M_\lambda\to M_{\mathfrak{p}}(\lambda)$ is

$$(1)\quad K_\lambda:=\sum_{\alpha\in S} M_{s_\alpha\cdot \lambda}\subset M_\lambda$$

where $S\subset\Delta$ is the set of those simple roots α such that the negative root spaces of root $-\alpha$ are in $\mathfrak{p}$ (the set S determines uniquely the subalgebra $\mathfrak{p}$), $s_\alpha$ is the root reflection with respect to the root α and $s_\alpha\cdot \lambda$ is the affine action of $s_\alpha$ on λ. It follows from the theory of (true) Verma modules that $M_{s_\alpha\cdot\lambda}$ is isomorphic to a unique submodule of $M_\lambda$. In (1), we identified $M_{s_\alpha\cdot\lambda}\subset M_\lambda$. The sum in (1) is not direct.

In the special case when $S=\emptyset$, the parabolic subalgebra $\mathfrak{p}$ is the Borel subalgebra and the GVM coincides with (true) Verma module. In the other extremal case when $S=\Delta$, $\mathfrak{p}=\mathfrak{g}$ and the GVM is isomorphic to the inducing representation V.

The GVM $M_{\mathfrak{p}}(\lambda)$ is called regular, if its highest weight λ is on the affine Weyl orbit of a dominant weight $\tilde\lambda$. In other word, there exist an element w of the Weyl group W such that

$$\lambda=w\cdot\tilde\lambda$$

where $\cdot$ is the affine action of the Weyl group.

The Verma module $M_\lambda$ is called singular, if there is no dominant weight on the affine orbit of λ. In this case, there exists a weight $\tilde\lambda$ so that $\tilde\lambda+\delta$ is on the wall of the fundamental Weyl chamber (δ is the sum of all fundamental weights).

== Homomorphisms of GVMs ==
By a homomorphism of GVMs we mean $\mathfrak{g}$-homomorphism.

For any two weights $\lambda, \mu$ a homomorphism

$$M_{\mathfrak{p}}(\mu)\rightarrow M_{\mathfrak{p}}(\lambda)$$

may exist only if $\mu$ and $\lambda$ are linked with an affine action of the Weyl group $W$ of the Lie algebra $\mathfrak{g}$. This follows easily from the Harish-Chandra theorem on infinitesimal central characters.

Unlike in the case of (true) Verma modules, the homomorphisms of GVM's are in general not injective and the dimension

$$dim(Hom(M_{\mathfrak{p}}(\mu), M_{\mathfrak{p}}(\lambda)))$$

may be larger than one in some specific cases.

If $f: M_\mu\to M_\lambda$ is a homomorphism of (true) Verma modules, $K_\mu$ resp. $K_\lambda$ is the kernels of the projection $M_\mu\to M_{\mathfrak{p}}(\mu)$, resp. $M_\lambda\to M_{\mathfrak{p}}(\lambda)$, then there exists a homomorphism $K_\mu\to K_\lambda$ and f factors to a homomorphism of generalized Verma modules $M_{\mathfrak{p}}(\mu)\to M_{\mathfrak{p}}(\lambda)$. Such a homomorphism (that is a factor of a homomorphism of Verma modules) is called standard. However, the standard homomorphism may be zero in some cases.

=== Standard ===
Let us suppose that there exists a nontrivial homomorphism of true Verma modules $M_\mu \to M_\lambda$. Let $S\subset\Delta$ be the set of those simple roots α such that the negative root spaces of root $-\alpha$ are in $\mathfrak{p}$ (like in section Properties). The following theorem is proved by Lepowsky:

The standard homomorphism $M_{\mathfrak{p}}(\mu)\to M_{\mathfrak{p}}(\lambda)$ is zero if and only if there exists $\alpha\in S$ such that $M_\mu$ is isomorphic to a submodule of $M_{s_\alpha\cdot \lambda}$ ($s_\alpha$ is the corresponding root reflection and $\cdot$ is the affine action).

The structure of GVMs on the affine orbit of a $\mathfrak{g}$-dominant and $\mathfrak{g}$-integral weight $\tilde\lambda$ can be described explicitly. If W is the Weyl group of $\mathfrak{g}$, there exists a subset $W^{\mathfrak{p}}\subset W$ of such elements, so that $w\in W^{\mathfrak{p}}\Leftrightarrow w(\tilde\lambda)$ is $\mathfrak{p}$-dominant. It can be shown that $W^{\mathfrak{p}}\simeq W_{\mathfrak{p}}\backslash W$ where $W_{\mathfrak{p}}$ is the Weyl group of $\mathfrak{p}$ (in particular, $W^{\mathfrak{p}}$ does not depend on the choice of $\tilde\lambda$). The map $w\in W^{\mathfrak{p}} \mapsto M_{\mathfrak{p}}(w\cdot\tilde\lambda)$ is a bijection between $W^{\mathfrak{p}}$ and the set of GVM's with highest weights on the affine orbit of $\tilde\lambda$. Let as suppose that $\mu=w'\cdot\tilde\lambda$, $\lambda=w\cdot\tilde\lambda$ and $w\leq w'$ in the Bruhat ordering (otherwise, there is no homomorphism of (true) Verma modules $M_\mu\to M_\lambda$ and the standard homomorphism does not make sense, see Homomorphisms of Verma modules).

The following statements follow from the above theorem and the structure of $W^{\mathfrak{p}}$:

Theorem. If $w'=s_\gamma w$ for some positive root $\gamma$ and the length (see Bruhat ordering) l(w')=l(w)+1, then there exists a nonzero standard homomorphism $M_{\mathfrak{p}}(\mu)\to M_{\mathfrak{p}}(\lambda)$.

Theorem. The standard homomorphism $M_{\mathfrak{p}}(\mu)\to M_{\mathfrak{p}}(\lambda)$ is zero if and only if there exists $w''\in W$ such that $w\leq w''\leq w'$ and $w''\notin W^{\mathfrak{p}}$.

However, if $\tilde\lambda$ is only dominant but not integral, there may still exist $\mathfrak{p}$-dominant and $\mathfrak{p}$-integral weights on its affine orbit.

The situation is even more complicated if the GVM's have singular character, i.e. there $\mu$ and $\lambda$ are on the affine orbit of some $\tilde\lambda$ such that $\tilde\lambda+\delta$ is on the wall of the fundamental Weyl chamber.

=== Nonstandard ===
A homomorphism $M_{\mathfrak{p}}(\mu)\to M_{\mathfrak{p}}(\lambda)$ is called nonstandard, if it is not standard. It may happen that the standard homomorphism of GVMs is zero but there still exists a nonstandard homomorphism.

== Examples ==
- The fields of conformal field theory belong to generalized Verma modules of the conformal algebra.

== See also ==
- Verma module
- Parabolic geometry
