= Standard monomial theory =

In algebraic geometry, standard monomial theory describes the sections of a line bundle over a generalized flag variety or Schubert variety of a reductive algebraic group by giving an explicit basis of elements called standard monomials. Many of the results have been extended to Kac–Moody algebras and their groups.

There are monographs on standard monomial theory by Lakshmibai & Raghavan (2008) and Seshadri (2007) and survey articles by V. Lakshmibai, C. Musili, and C. S. Seshadri (1979) and V. Lakshmibai and C. S. Seshadri (1991).

One of important open problems is to give a completely geometric construction of the theory.

== History ==
Alfred Young (1928) introduced monomials associated to standard Young tableaux. Hodge (1943) (see also (Hodge & Pedoe 1994, p.378)) used Young's monomials, which he called standard power products, named after standard tableaux, to give a basis for the homogeneous coordinate rings of complex Grassmannians. Seshadri (1978) initiated a program, called standard monomial theory, to extend Hodge's work to varieties G/P, for P any parabolic subgroup of any reductive algebraic group in any characteristic, by giving explicit bases using standard monomials for sections of line bundles over these varieties. The case of Grassmannians studied by Hodge corresponds to the case when G is a special linear group in characteristic 0 and P is a maximal parabolic subgroup. Seshadri was soon joined in this effort by V. Lakshmibai and Chitikila Musili. They worked out standard monomial theory first for minuscule representations of G and then for groups G of classical type, and formulated several conjectures describing it for more general cases. Littelmann (1998) proved their conjectures using the Littelmann path model, in particular giving a uniform description of standard monomials for all reductive groups.

Lakshmibai (2003) and Musili (2003) and Seshadri (2012) give detailed descriptions of the early development of standard monomial theory.

== Applications ==
- Since the sections of line bundles over generalized flag varieties tend to form irreducible representations of the corresponding algebraic groups, having an explicit basis of standard monomials allows one to give character formulas for these representations. Similarly one gets character formulas for Demazure modules. The explicit bases given by standard monomial theory are closely related to crystal bases and Littelmann path models of representations.
- Standard monomial theory allows one to describe the singularities of Schubert varieties, and in particular sometimes proves that Schubert varieties are normal or Cohen–Macaulay.
- Standard monomial theory can be used to prove Demazure's conjecture.
- Standard monomial theory proves the Kempf vanishing theorem and other vanishing theorems for the higher cohomology of effective line bundles over Schubert varieties.
- Standard monomial theory gives explicit bases for some rings of invariants in invariant theory.
- Standard monomial theory gives generalizations of the Littlewood–Richardson rule about decompositions of tensor products of representations to all reductive algebraic groups.
- Standard monomial theory can be used to prove the existence of good filtrations on some representations of reductive algebraic groups in positive characteristic.
