= Verma module =

Objects in representation theory of Lie algebras

Verma modules, named after Daya-Nand Verma, are objects in the representation theory of Lie algebras, a branch of mathematics.

Verma modules can be used in the classification of irreducible representations of a complex semisimple Lie algebra. Specifically, although Verma modules themselves are infinite dimensional, quotients of them can be used to construct finite-dimensional representations with highest weight $\lambda$, where $\lambda$ is dominant and integral. Their homomorphisms correspond to invariant differential operators over flag manifolds.

== Informal construction ==
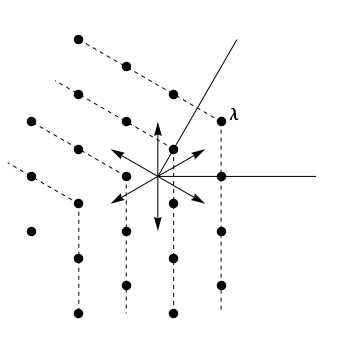
Weights of Verma module for $\mathfrak{sl}(3,\mathbb{C})$ with highest weight $\lambda$

We can explain the idea of a Verma module as follows. Let $\mathfrak{g}$ be a semisimple Lie algebra (over $\mathbb{C}$, for simplicity). Let $\mathfrak{h}$ be a fixed Cartan subalgebra of $\mathfrak{g}$ and let $R$ be the associated root system. Let $R^+$ be a fixed set of positive roots. For each $\alpha\in R^+$, choose a nonzero element $X_\alpha$ for the corresponding root space $\mathfrak{g}_\alpha$ and a nonzero element $Y_\alpha$ in the root space $\mathfrak{g}_{-\alpha}$. We think of the $X_\alpha$'s as "raising operators" and the $Y_\alpha$'s as "lowering operators."

Now let $\lambda\in\mathfrak{h}^*$ be an arbitrary linear functional, not necessarily dominant or integral. Our goal is to construct a representation $W_\lambda$ of $\mathfrak{g}$ with highest weight $\lambda$ that is generated by a single nonzero vector $v$ with weight $\lambda$. The Verma module is one particular such highest-weight module, one that is maximal in the sense that every other highest-weight module with highest weight $\lambda$ is a quotient of the Verma module. It will turn out that Verma modules are always infinite dimensional; if $\lambda$ is dominant integral, however, one can construct a finite-dimensional quotient module of the Verma module. Thus, Verma modules play an important role in the classification of finite-dimensional representations of $\mathfrak{g}$. Specifically, they are an important tool in the hard part of the theorem of the highest weight, namely showing that every dominant integral element actually arises as the highest weight of a finite-dimensional irreducible representation of $\mathfrak{g}$.

We now attempt to understand intuitively what the Verma module with highest weight $\lambda$ should look like. Since $v$ is to be a highest weight vector with weight $\lambda$, we certainly want

$$H\cdot v=\lambda(H)v,\quad H\in\mathfrak{h}$$

and

$$X_\alpha\cdot v=0,\quad\alpha\in R^+$$.

Then $W_\lambda$ should be spanned by elements obtained by lowering $v$ by the action of the $Y_\alpha$'s:

$$Y_{\alpha_{i_1}}\cdots Y_{\alpha_{i_M}}\cdot v$$.

We now impose only those relations among vectors of the above form required by the commutation relations among the $Y$'s. In particular, the Verma module is always infinite-dimensional. The weights of the Verma module with highest weight $\lambda$ will consist of all elements $\mu$ that can be obtained from $\lambda$ by subtracting integer combinations of positive roots. The figure shows the weights of a Verma module for $\mathfrak{sl}(3;\mathbb C)$.

A simple re-ordering argument shows that there is only one possible way the full Lie algebra $\mathfrak{g}$ can act on this space. Specifically, if $Z$ is any element of $\mathfrak{g}$, then by the easy part of the Poincaré–Birkhoff–Witt theorem, we can rewrite

$$ZY_{\alpha_{i_1}}\cdots Y_{\alpha_{i_M}}$$

as a linear combination of products of Lie algebra elements with the raising operators $X_\alpha$ acting first, the elements of the Cartan subalgebra, and last the lowering operators $Y_\alpha$. Applying this sum of terms to $v$, any term with a raising operator is zero, any factors in the Cartan act as scalars, and thus we end up with an element of the original form.

To understand the structure of the Verma module a bit better, we may choose an ordering of the positive roots as $\alpha_1,\ldots\alpha_n$ and we denote the corresponding lowering operators by $Y_1,\ldots Y_n$. Then by a simple re-ordering argument, every element of the above form can be rewritten as a linear combination of elements with the $Y$'s in a specific order:

$$Y_1^{k_1}\cdots Y_n^{k_n}v$$,

where the $k_j$'s are non-negative integers. Actually, it turns out that such vectors form a basis for the Verma module.

Although this description of the Verma module gives an intuitive idea of what $W_\lambda$ looks like, it still remains to give a rigorous construction of it. In any case, the Verma module gives—for any $\lambda$, not necessarily dominant or integral—a representation with highest weight $\lambda$. The price we pay for this relatively simple construction is that $W_\lambda$ is always infinite dimensional. In the case where $\lambda$ is dominant and integral, one can construct a finite-dimensional, irreducible quotient of the Verma module.

== The case of sl(2; C) ==
Let ${X,Y,H}$ be the usual basis for $\mathrm{sl}(2;\mathbb{C})$:

$$X = \begin{pmatrix}
0 & 1\\
0 & 0
\end{pmatrix}
\qquad
Y = \begin{pmatrix}
0 & 0\\
1 & 0
\end{pmatrix}
\qquad
H = \begin{pmatrix}
1 & 0\\
0 & -1
\end{pmatrix}  ~,$$

with the Cartan subalgebra being the span of $H$. Let $\lambda$ be defined by $\lambda(H)=m$ for an arbitrary complex number $m$. Then the Verma module with highest weight $\lambda$ is spanned by linearly independent vectors $v_0,v_1,v_2,\dots$ and the action of the basis elements is as follows:

$$Y\cdot v_j=v_{j+1};\quad X\cdot v_j=j(m-(j-1))v_{j-1};\quad H\cdot v_j=(m-2j)v_j$$.

(This means in particular that $H\cdot v_0=mv_0$ and that $X\cdot v_0=0$.) These formulas are motivated by the way the basis elements act in the finite-dimensional representations of $\mathrm{sl}(2;\mathbb{C})$, except that we no longer require that the "chain" of eigenvectors for $H$ has to terminate.

In this construction, $m$ is an arbitrary complex number, not necessarily real or positive or an integer. Nevertheless, the case where $m$ is a non-negative integer is special. In that case, the span of the vectors $v_{m+1},v_{m+2},\ldots$ is easily seen to be invariant—because $X\cdot v_{m+1}=0$. The quotient module is then the finite-dimensional irreducible representation of $\mathrm{sl}(2;\mathbb{C})$ of dimension $m+1.$

== Definition of Verma modules ==
There are two standard constructions of the Verma module, both of which involve the concept of universal enveloping algebra. We continue the notation of the previous section: $\mathfrak{g}$ is a complex semisimple Lie algebra, $\mathfrak{h}$ is a fixed Cartan subalgebra, $R$ is the associated root system with a fixed set $R^+$ of positive roots. For each $\alpha\in R^+$, we choose nonzero elements $X_\alpha\in\mathfrak{g}_\alpha$ and $Y_\alpha\in\mathfrak{g}_{-\alpha}$.

=== As a quotient of the enveloping algebra ===
The first construction of the Verma module is a quotient of the universal enveloping algebra $U(\mathfrak{g})$ of $\mathfrak{g}$. Since the Verma module is supposed to be a $\mathfrak{g}$-module, it will also be a $U(\mathfrak{g})$-module, by the universal property of the enveloping algebra. Thus, if we have a Verma module $W_\lambda$ with highest weight vector $v$, there will be a linear map $\Phi$ from $U(\mathfrak{g})$ into $W_\lambda$ given by

$$\Phi(x)=x\cdot v,\quad x\in U(\mathfrak{g})$$.

Since $W_\lambda$ is supposed to be generated by $v$, the map $\Phi$ should be surjective. Since $v$ is supposed to be a highest weight vector, the kernel of $\Phi$ should include all the root vectors $X_\alpha$ for $\alpha$ in $R^+$. Since, also, $v$ is supposed to be a weight vector with weight $\lambda$, the kernel of $\Phi$ should include all vectors of the form

$$H-\lambda(H)1,\quad H\in\mathfrak{h}$$.

Finally, the kernel of $\Phi$ should be a left ideal in $U(\mathfrak{g})$; after all, if $x\cdot v=0$ then $(yx)\cdot v=y\cdot (x\cdot v)=0$ for all $y\in U(\mathfrak{g})$.

The previous discussion motivates the following construction of Verma module. We define $W_\lambda$ as the quotient vector space

$$W_\lambda=U(\mathfrak{g})/I_\lambda$$,

where $I_\lambda$ is the left ideal generated by all elements of the form

$$X_\alpha,\quad\alpha\in R^+,$$

and

$$H-\lambda(H)1,\quad H\in\mathfrak{h}$$.

Because $I_\lambda$ is a left ideal, the natural left action of $U(\mathfrak{g})$ on itself carries over to the quotient. Thus, $W_\lambda$ is a $U(\mathfrak{g})$-module and therefore also a $\mathfrak{g}$-module.

=== By extension of scalars ===
The "extension of scalars" procedure is a method for changing a left module $V$ over one algebra $A_1$ (not necessarily commutative) into a left module over a larger algebra $A_2$ that contains $A_1$ as a subalgebra. We can think of $A_2$ as a right $A_1$-module, where $A_1$ acts on $A_2$ by multiplication on the right. Since $V$ is a left $A_1$-module and $A_2$ is a right $A_1$-module, we can form the tensor product of the two over the algebra $A_1$:

$$A_2\otimes_{A_1}V$$.

Now, since $A_2$ is a left $A_2$-module over itself, the above tensor product carries a left module structure over the larger algebra $A_2$, uniquely determined by the requirement that

$$a_1\cdot (a_2\otimes v)=(a_1a_2)\otimes v$$

for all $a_1$ and $a_2$ in $A_2$. Thus, starting from the left $A_1$-module $V$, we have produced a left $A_2$-module $A_2\otimes_{A_1}V$.

We now apply this construction in the setting of a semisimple Lie algebra. We let $\mathfrak{b}$ be the subalgebra of $\mathfrak{g}$ spanned by $\mathfrak{h}$ and the root vectors $X_\alpha$ with $\alpha\in R^+$. (Thus, $\mathfrak{b}$ is a "Borel subalgebra" of $\mathfrak{g}$.) We can form a left module $F_\lambda$ over the universal enveloping algebra $U(\mathfrak{b})$ as follows:

- $F_\lambda$ is the one-dimensional vector space spanned by a single vector $v$ together with a $\mathfrak{b}$-module structure such that $\mathfrak{h}$ acts as multiplication by $\lambda$ and the positive root spaces act trivially:

$$\quad H\cdot v=\lambda(H)v,\quad H\in\mathfrak{h};\quad X_\alpha\cdot v=0,\quad \alpha\in R^+$$.

The motivation for this formula is that it describes how $U(\mathfrak{b})$ is supposed to act on the highest weight vector in a Verma module.

Now, it follows from the Poincaré–Birkhoff–Witt theorem that $U(\mathfrak{b})$ is a subalgebra of $U(\mathfrak{g})$. Thus, we may apply the extension of scalars technique to convert $F_\lambda$ from a left $U(\mathfrak{b})$-module into a left $U(\mathfrak{g})$-module $W_\lambda$ as follow:

$$W_\lambda := U(\mathfrak{g}) \otimes_{U(\mathfrak{b})} F_\lambda$$.

Since $W_\lambda$ is a left $U(\mathfrak{g})$-module, it is, in particular, a module (representation) for $\mathfrak{g}$.

=== The structure of the Verma module ===
Whichever construction of the Verma module is used, one has to prove that it is nontrivial, i.e., not the zero module. Actually, it is possible to use the Poincaré–Birkhoff–Witt theorem to show that the underlying vector space of $W_\lambda$ is isomorphic to

$$U(\mathfrak{g}_-)$$

where $\mathfrak{g}_-$ is the Lie subalgebra generated by the negative root spaces of $\mathfrak{g}$ (that is, the $Y_\alpha$'s).

== Basic properties ==
Verma modules, considered as $\mathfrak{g}$-modules, are highest weight modules, i.e. they are generated by a highest weight vector. This highest weight vector is $1\otimes 1$ (the first $1$ is the unit in $\mathcal{U}(\mathfrak{g})$ and the second is the unit in the field $F$, considered as the $\mathfrak{b}$-module $F_\lambda$) and it has weight $\lambda$.

=== Multiplicities ===
Verma modules are weight modules, i.e. $W_\lambda$ is a direct sum of all its weight spaces. Each weight space in $W_\lambda$ is finite-dimensional and the dimension of the $\mu$-weight space $W_\mu$ is the number of ways of expressing $\lambda-\mu$ as a sum of positive roots (this is closely related to the so-called Kostant partition function). This assertion follows from the earlier claim that the Verma module is isomorphic as a vector space to $U(\mathfrak{g}_-)$, along with the Poincaré–Birkhoff–Witt theorem for $U(\mathfrak{g}_-)$.

=== Universal property ===
Verma modules have a very important property: If $V$ is any representation generated by a highest weight vector of weight $\lambda$, there is a surjective $\mathfrak{g}$-homomorphism $W_\lambda\to V.$ That is, all representations with highest weight $\lambda$ that are generated by the highest weight vector (so called highest weight modules) are quotients of $W_\lambda.$

=== Irreducible quotient module ===
$W_\lambda$ contains a unique maximal submodule, and its quotient is the unique (up to isomorphism) irreducible representation with highest weight $\lambda.$ If the highest weight $\lambda$ is dominant and integral, one then proves that this irreducible quotient is actually finite dimensional.

As an example, consider the case $\mathfrak g = \operatorname{sl}(2;\mathbb C)$ discussed above. If the highest weight $m$ is "dominant integral"—meaning simply that it is a non-negative integer—then $Xv_{m+1}=0$ and the span of the elements $v_{m+1},v_{m+2},\ldots$ is invariant. The quotient representation is then irreducible with dimension $m+1$. The quotient representation is spanned by linearly independent vectors $v_0,v_1,\ldots,v_m$. The action of $\operatorname{sl}(2;\mathbb C)$ is the same as in the Verma module, except that $Yv_m=0$ in the quotient, as compared to $Yv_m=v_{m+1}$ in the Verma module.

The Verma module $W_\lambda$ itself is irreducible if and only if $\lambda$ is antidominant. Consequently, when $\lambda$ is integral, $W_\lambda$ is irreducible if and only if none of the coordinates of $\lambda$ in the basis of fundamental weights is from the set $\{0,1,2,\ldots\}$, while in general, this condition is necessary but insufficient for $W_\lambda$ to be irreducible.

=== Other properties ===
The Verma module $W_\lambda$ is called regular, if its highest weight λ is on the affine Weyl orbit of a dominant weight $\tilde\lambda$. In other word, there exist an element w of the Weyl group W such that

$$\lambda=w\cdot\tilde\lambda$$

where $\cdot$ is the affine action of the Weyl group.

The Verma module $W_\lambda$ is called singular, if there is no dominant weight on the affine orbit of λ. In this case, there exists a weight $\tilde\lambda$ so that $\tilde\lambda+\delta$ is on the wall of the fundamental Weyl chamber (δ is the sum of all fundamental weights).

== Homomorphisms of Verma modules ==
For any two weights $\lambda, \mu$ a non-trivial homomorphism

$$W_\mu\rightarrow W_\lambda$$

may exist only if $\mu$ and $\lambda$ are linked with an affine action of the Weyl group $W$ of the Lie algebra $\mathfrak{g}$. This follows easily from the Harish-Chandra theorem on infinitesimal central characters.

Each homomorphism of Verma modules is injective and the dimension

$$\dim(\operatorname{Hom}(W_\mu, W_\lambda))\leq 1$$

for any $\mu, \lambda$. So, there exists a nonzero $W_\mu\rightarrow W_\lambda$ if and only if $W_\mu$ is isomorphic to a (unique) submodule of $W_\lambda$.

The full classification of Verma module homomorphisms was done by Bernstein–Gelfand–Gelfand and Verma and can be summed up in the following statement:

There exists a nonzero homomorphism $W_\mu\rightarrow W_\lambda$ if and only if there exists

a sequence of weights

$$\mu=\nu_0\leq\nu_1\leq\ldots\leq\nu_k=\lambda$$

such that $\nu_{i-1}+\delta=s_{\gamma_i}(\nu_i+\delta)$ for some positive roots $\gamma_i$ (and $s_{\gamma_i}$ is the corresponding root reflection and $\delta$ is the sum of all fundamental weights) and for each $1\leq i\leq k, (\nu_i+\delta)(H_{\gamma_i})$ is a natural number ($H_{\gamma_i}$ is the coroot associated to the root $\gamma_i$).

If the Verma modules $M_\mu$ and $M_\lambda$ are regular, then there exists a unique dominant weight $\tilde\lambda$ and unique elements w, w′ of the Weyl group W such that

$$\mu=w'\cdot\tilde\lambda$$

and

$$\lambda=w\cdot\tilde\lambda,$$

where $\cdot$ is the affine action of the Weyl group. If the weights are further integral, then there exists a nonzero homomorphism

$$W_\mu\to W_\lambda$$

if and only if

$$w \leq w'$$

in the Bruhat ordering of the Weyl group.

== Jordan–Hölder series ==
Let

$$0\subset A\subset B\subset W_\lambda$$

be a sequence of $\mathfrak{g}$-modules so that the quotient B/A is irreducible with highest weight μ. Then there exists a nonzero homomorphism $W_\mu\to W_\lambda$.

An easy consequence of this is, that for any highest weight modules $V_\mu, V_\lambda$ such that

$$V_\mu\subset V_\lambda$$

there exists a nonzero homomorphism $W_\mu\to W_\lambda$.

== Bernstein–Gelfand–Gelfand resolution ==
Let $V_\lambda$ be a finite-dimensional irreducible representation of the Lie algebra $\mathfrak{g}$ with highest weight λ. We know from the section about homomorphisms of Verma modules that there exists a homomorphism

$$W_{w'\cdot\lambda}\to W_{w\cdot\lambda}$$

if and only if

$$w\leq w'$$

in the Bruhat ordering of the Weyl group. The following theorem describes a projective resolution of $V_\lambda$ in terms of Verma modules (it was proved by Bernstein–Gelfand–Gelfand in 1975) :

There exists an exact sequence of $\mathfrak{g}$-homomorphisms

$$0\to \oplus_{w\in W,\,\, \ell(w)=n} W_{w\cdot \lambda}\to \cdots \to \oplus_{w\in W,\,\, \ell(w)=2} W_{w\cdot \lambda}\to \oplus_{w\in W,\,\, \ell(w)=1} W_{w\cdot \lambda}\to W_\lambda\to V_\lambda\to 0$$

where n is the length of the largest element of the Weyl group.

A similar resolution exists for generalized Verma modules as well. It is denoted shortly as the BGG resolution.

== See also ==
- Classifying finite-dimensional representations of Lie algebras
- Theorem of the highest weight
- Generalized Verma module
- Weyl module
