= Michel Demazure =

French mathematician

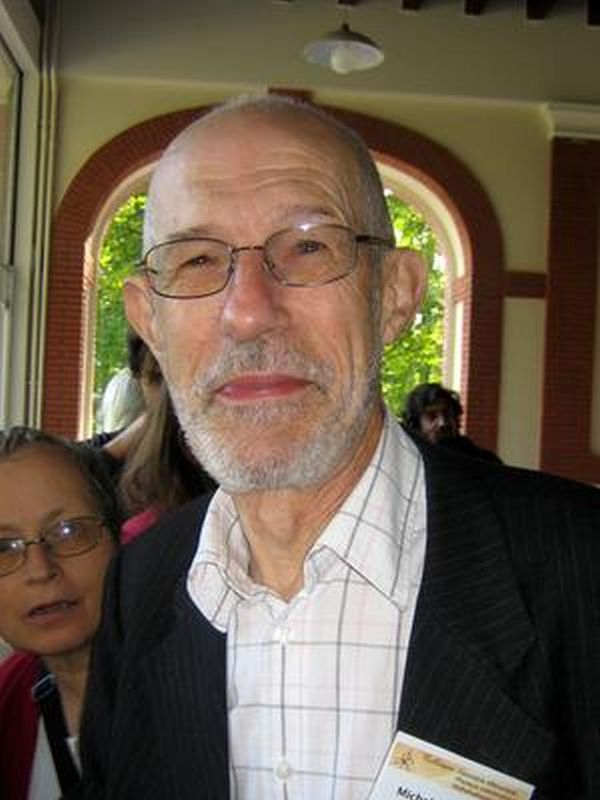
- Michel Demazure, Bures-sur-Yvette 2007
- Born: 2 March 1937 (age 89); Neuilly-sur-Seine
- Education: University of Paris
- Known for: Demazure conjecture Demazure module Group scheme Root datum
- Awards: Peccot Lecture (1966)
- Scientific career
- Fields: Mathematics
- Workplaces: École Polytechnique
- Doctoral advisor: Alexander Grothendieck
- Doctoral students: Guy Rousseau

Michel Demazure (French: [dəmazyʁ]; born 2 March 1937) is a French mathematician. He made contributions in the fields of abstract algebra, algebraic geometry, and computer vision, and participated in the Nicolas Bourbaki collective. He has also been president of the French Mathematical Society and directed two French science museums.

== Biography ==
In the 1960s, Demazure was a student of Alexandre Grothendieck, and, together with Grothendieck, he ran and edited the Séminaire de Géométrie Algébrique du Bois Marie on group schemes at the Institut des Hautes Études Scientifiques near Paris from 1962 to 1964. Demazure obtained his doctorate from the Université de Paris in 1965 under Grothendieck's supervision, with a dissertation entitled Schémas en groupes réductifs. He was maître de conférence at Strasbourg University (1964–1966), and then university professor at Paris-Sud in Orsay (1966–1976) and the École Polytechnique in Palaiseau (1976–1999). From approximately 1965 to 1985, he was also one of the core members of the Bourbaki group, a group of French mathematicians writing under the collective pseudonym Nicolas Bourbaki.

In 1988 Demazure was the president of the Société Mathématique de France. From 1991 to 1998, he was the director of the Palais de la Découverte in Paris and, from 1998 to 2002, the chairman of the Cité des Sciences et de l'Industrie in La Villette, two major science museums in France; in taking these positions, he changed places with Jean Audouze, who was at La Villette from 1993 to 1996, and became director of the Palais de la Découverte on Demazure's departure. Demazure also chairs the regional advisory committee of research for Languedoc-Roussillon.

== Research contributions ==
In SGA3, Demazure introduced the definition of a root datum, a generalization of root systems for reductive groups that is central to the notion of Langlands duality. A 1970 paper of Demazure on subgroups of the Cremona group has been later recognized as the beginning of the study of toric varieties.

The Demazure character formula and Demazure modules and Demazure conjecture are named after Demazure, who wrote about them in 1974. Demazure modules are submodules of a finite-dimensional representation of a semisimple Lie algebra, and the Demazure character formula is an extension of the Weyl character formula to these modules. Demazure's work in this area was marred by a dependence on a false lemma in an earlier paper (also by Demazure); the flaw was pointed out by Victor Kac, and subsequent research clarified the conditions under which the formula remains valid.

Later in his career, Demazure's research emphasis shifted from pure mathematics to more computational problems, involving the application of algebraic geometry to image reconstruction problems in computer vision. The Kruppa–Demazure theorem, stemming from this work, shows that if a scene consisting of five points is viewed from two cameras with unknown positions but known focal lengths then, in general, there will be exactly ten different scenes that could have generated the same two images. Austrian mathematician Erwin Kruppa had many years earlier narrowed the number of possible scenes to eleven, and Demazure provided the first complete solution to the problem.

== Books ==
- Schémas en groupes. I: Propriétés générales des schémas en groupes (SGA3, vol. I, with Grothendieck). Lecture Notes in Mathematics 151, Berlin: Springer-Verlag, 1970. MR 0274458.
- Schémas en groupes. II: Groupes de type multiplicatif, et structure des schémas en groupes généraux (SGA3, vol. II, with Grothendieck). Lecture Notes in Mathematics 152, Berlin: Springer-Verlag, 1970. MR 0274459.
- Schémas en groupes. III: Structure des schémas en groupes réductifs (SGA3, vol. III, with Grothendieck). Lecture Notes in Mathematics 153, Berlin: Springer-Verlag, 1970. MR 0274460.
- Groupes algébriques. Tome I: Géométrie algébrique, généralités, groupes commutatifs (with Pierre Gabriel). Masson, Amsterdam: North Holland, 1970. MR 0302656. Partially translated into English by J. Bell as Introduction to Algebraic Geometry and Algebraic Groups, Volume 39 of North-Holland Mathematics Studies, Elsevier, 1980, MR 0563524.
- Lectures on p-divisible groups. Lecture Notes in Mathematics 302, Berlin: Springer-Verlag, 1972, 1986, ISBN 3-540-06092-8. MR 0344261, MR 0883960.
- Bifurcations and catastrophes: Geometry of solutions to nonlinear problems. Universitext, Berlin: Springer-Verlag, 2000. Translated from the French (1989) by David Chillingworth. MR 1739190.
- Cours d'Algèbre: Primalité. Divisibilité. Codes. Paris: Cassini, 1997, 2008. MR 1466448.

== See also ==
- Bott–Samelson resolution
