= Kostant partition function =

Function in representation theory

In representation theory, a branch of mathematics, the Kostant partition function, introduced by Bertram Kostant (1958, 1959), of a root system $\Delta$ is the number of ways one can represent a vector (weight) as a non-negative integer combination of the positive roots $\Delta^+\subset\Delta$. Kostant used it to rewrite the Weyl character formula as a formula (the Kostant multiplicity formula) for the multiplicity of a weight of an irreducible representation of a semisimple Lie algebra. An alternative formula, that is more computationally efficient in some cases, is Freudenthal's formula.

The Kostant partition function can also be defined for Kac–Moody algebras and has similar properties.

== Examples ==
=== A_{2} ===
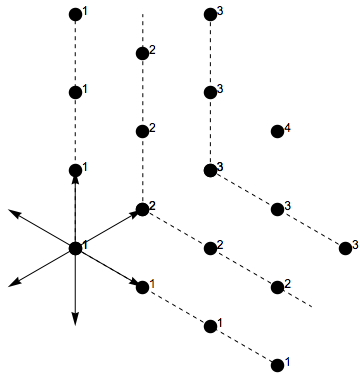
The Kostant partition function for the A2 root system

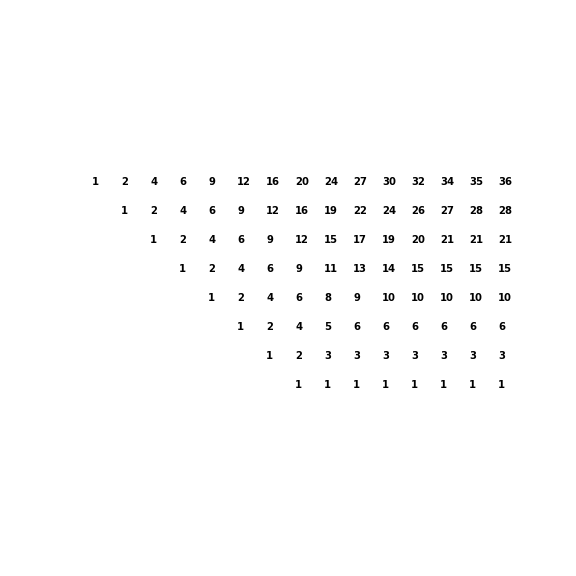
Values of the Kostant partition function for the root system $B_2$. The root system is given the Euclidean coordinates $\alpha_1 = (1,0), \alpha_2 = (-1, 1)$.

Consider the A2 root system, with positive roots $\alpha_1$, $\alpha_2$, and $\alpha_3:=\alpha_1+\alpha_2$. If an element $\mu$ can be expressed as a non-negative integer linear combination of $\alpha_1$, $\alpha_2$, and $\alpha_3$, then since $\alpha_3=\alpha_1+\alpha_2$, it can also be expressed as a non-negative integer linear combination of the positive simple roots $\alpha_1$ and $\alpha_2$:

$$\mu=n_1\alpha_1+n_2\alpha_2$$

with $n_1$ and $n_2$ being non-negative integers. This expression gives one way to write $\mu$ as a non-negative integer combination of positive roots; other expressions can be obtained by replacing $\alpha_1+\alpha_2$ with $\alpha_3$ some number of times. We can do the replacement $k$ times, where $0\leq k\leq\mathrm{min}(n_1,n_2)$. Thus, if the Kostant partition function is denoted by $p$, we obtain the formula

$$p(n_1\alpha_1+n_2\alpha_2)=1+\mathrm{min}(n_1,n_2)$$.

This result is shown graphically in the image at right. If an element $\mu$ is not of the form $\mu=n_1\alpha_1+n_2\alpha_2$, then $p(\mu)=0$.

=== B_{2} ===
The partition function for the other rank 2 root systems are more complicated but are known explicitly.

For B_{2}, the positive simple roots are $\alpha_1 = (1, 0), \alpha_2 = (0,1)$, and the positive roots are the simple roots together with $\alpha_3 = (1,1)$ and $\alpha_4 = (2,1)$. The partition function can be viewed as a function of two non-negative integers $n_1$ and $n_2$, which represent the element $n_1 \alpha_1 + n_2 \alpha_2$. Then the partition function $P(n_1, n_2)$ can be defined piecewise with the help of two auxiliary functions.

If $n_1 \leq n_2$, then $P(n_1, n_2) = b(n_1)$. If $n_2 \leq n_1 \leq 2 n_2$, then $P(n_1, n_2) = q_2(n_2) - b(2n_2 - n_1 - 1) = b(n_1) - q_2(n_1 - n_2 - 1)$. If $2n_2 \leq n_1$, then $P(n_1, n_2) = q_2(n_2)$. The auxiliary functions are defined for $n \geq 1$ and are given by $q_2(n) = \frac{1}{2}(n + 1)(n + 2)$ and $b(n) = \frac{1}{4}(n+2)^2$ for $n$ even, $\frac{1}{4}(n+1)(n+3)$ for $n$ odd.

=== G_{2} ===
For G_{2}, the positive roots are $(1,0), (0,1), (1,1), (2,1), (3,1)$ and $(3,2)$, with $(1,0)$ denoting the short simple root and $(0,1)$ denoting the long simple root.

The partition function is defined piecewise with the domain divided into five regions, with the help of two auxiliary functions.

== Relation to the Weyl character formula ==
=== Inverting the Weyl denominator ===
For each root $\alpha$ and each $H\in\mathfrak{h}$, we can formally apply the formula for the sum of a geometric series to obtain

$$\frac{1}{1-e^{-\alpha(H)}}=1+e^{-\alpha(H)}+e^{-2\alpha(H)}+\cdots$$

where we do not worry about convergence—that is, the equality is understood at the level of formal power series. Using Weyl's denominator formula

$${\sum_{w\in W} (-1)^{\ell(w)}e^{w\cdot\rho(H)} = e^{\rho(H)}\prod_{\alpha>0}(1-e^{-\alpha(H)})},$$

we obtain a formal expression for the reciprocal of the Weyl denominator:

$$\begin{align}
\frac{1}{\sum_{w\in W} (-1)^{\ell(w)}e^{w\cdot\rho(H)}}&{}=e^{-\rho(H)}\prod_{\alpha>0}(1+e^{-\alpha(H)}+e^{-2\alpha(H)}+e^{-3\alpha(H)}+\cdots) \\
&{}=e^{-\rho(H)}\sum_{\mu}p(\mu)e^{-\mu(H)}
\end{align}$$

Here, the first equality is by taking a product over the positive roots of the geometric series formula and the second equality is by counting all the ways a given exponential $e^{\mu(H)}$ can occur in the product. The function $\ell(w)$ is zero if the argument is a rotation and one if the argument is a reflection.

=== Rewriting the character formula ===
This argument shows that we can convert the Weyl character formula for the irreducible representation with highest weight $\lambda$:

$$\operatorname{ch}V = {\sum_{w\in W} (-1)^{\ell(w)}e^{w\cdot(\lambda+\rho)(H)} \over \sum_{w\in W} (-1)^{\ell(w)}e^{w\cdot\rho(H)}}$$

from a quotient to a product:

$$\operatorname{ch}V = \left(\sum_{w\in W} (-1)^{\ell(w)}e^{w\cdot(\lambda+\rho)(H)}\right) \left(e^{-\rho(H)}\sum_{\mu}p(\mu)e^{-\mu(H)}\right)  .$$

=== The multiplicity formula ===
Using the preceding rewriting of the character formula, it is relatively easy to write the character as a sum of exponentials. The coefficients of these exponentials are the multiplicities of the corresponding weights. We thus obtain a formula for the multiplicity of a given weight $\mu$ in the irreducible representation with highest weight $\lambda$:

$$\operatorname{mult} \mu = \sum_{w\in W}(-1)^{\ell(w)}p(w\cdot(\lambda+\rho)-(\mu+\rho))$$.

This result is the Kostant multiplicity formula.

The dominant term in this formula is the term $w=1$; the contribution of this term is $p(\lambda-\mu)$, which is just the multiplicity of $\mu$ in the Verma module with highest weight $\lambda$. If $\lambda$ is sufficiently far inside the fundamental Weyl chamber and $\mu$ is sufficiently close to $\lambda$, it may happen that all other terms in the formula are zero. Specifically, unless $w\cdot(\lambda+\rho)$ is higher than $\mu+\rho$, the value of the Kostant partition function on $w\cdot(\lambda+\rho)-(\mu+\rho)$ will be zero. Thus, although the sum is nominally over the whole Weyl group, in most cases, the number of nonzero terms is smaller than the order of the Weyl group.

== Sources ==
- Hall, Brian C. (2015), Lie Groups, Lie Algebras, and Representations: An Elementary Introduction, Graduate Texts in Mathematics, vol. 222 (2nd ed.), Springer, ISBN 978-3319134666
- Humphreys, J.E. Introduction to Lie algebras and representation theory, Springer, 1972.
- Kostant, Bertram (1958), "A formula for the multiplicity of a weight", Proceedings of the National Academy of Sciences of the United States of America, 44 (6), National Academy of Sciences: 588–589, Bibcode:1958PNAS...44..588K, doi:10.1073/pnas.44.6.588, ISSN 0027-8424, JSTOR 89667, MR 0099387, PMC 528626, PMID 16590246
- Kostant, Bertram (1959), "A formula for the multiplicity of a weight", Transactions of the American Mathematical Society, 93 (1), American Mathematical Society: 53–73, doi:10.2307/1993422, ISSN 0002-9947, JSTOR 1993422, MR 0109192, PMC 528626
