= Minuscule (disambiguation) =

Minuscule may refer to:

- of very small size
- Lower case letter, see Letter case § Minuscule
- Mini scule, a species of microhylid frog
- Minuscule script, a group of writing styles in ancient and medieval Greek or Latin manuscripts:
  - Minuscule cursive or new Roman cursive, used in Latin manuscripts (3rd–7th century AD)
  - Carolingian minuscule, used in western Europe (8th–12th century AD)
  - Greek minuscule, used in Greek manuscripts since the 9th century AD
  - Some varieties of insular script, used in British Isles in the Early Middle Ages
- Any book written in minuscule script, especially
  - Greek biblical manuscripts, New Testament minuscules
- Minuscule (TV series), a French-made animated television series
- Minuscule: Valley of the Lost Ants, a 2013 France/Belgium animated film
- Minuscule (DVD), a video album by Björk
- Minuscule representation in mathematics
