= Steinberg formula =

Formula in representation theory

In mathematical representation theory, Steinberg's formula, introduced by Steinberg (1961), describes the multiplicity of an irreducible representation of a semisimple complex Lie algebra in a tensor product of two irreducible representations. It is a consequence of the Weyl character formula, and for the Lie algebra sl_{2} it is essentially the Clebsch–Gordan formula.

Steinberg's formula states that the multiplicity of the irreducible representation of highest weight ν in the tensor product of the irreducible representations with highest weights λ and μ is given by

$$\sum_{w,w^\prime\in W} \epsilon(ww^\prime)P(w(\lambda+\rho)+w^\prime(\mu+\rho)-(\nu+2\rho))$$

where W is the Weyl group, ε is the determinant of an element of the Weyl group, ρ is the Weyl vector, and P is the Kostant partition function giving the number of ways of writing a vector as a sum of positive roots.
