= Root datum =

In mathematical group theory, the root datum of a connected split reductive algebraic group over a field is a generalization of a root system that determines the group up to isomorphism. They were introduced by Michel Demazure in SGA III, published in 1970.

== Definition ==
A root datum consists of a quadruple

$$(X^\ast, \Phi, X_\ast, \Phi^\vee)$$,

where

- $X^\ast$ and $X_\ast$ are free abelian groups of finite rank together with a perfect pairing between them with values in $\mathbb{Z}$ which we denote by ( , ) (in other words, each is identified with the dual of the other).
- $\Phi$ is a finite subset of $X^\ast$ and $\Phi^\vee$ is a finite subset of $X_\ast$ and there is a bijection from $\Phi$ onto $\Phi^\vee$, denoted by $\alpha\mapsto\alpha^\vee$.
- For each $\alpha\in\Phi$, $(\alpha, \alpha^\vee)=2$.
- For each $\alpha\in\Phi$, the map $x\mapsto x-(x,\alpha^\vee)\alpha$ induces an automorphism of the root datum (in other words it maps $\Phi$ to $\Phi$ and the induced action on $X_\ast$ maps $\Phi^\vee$ to $\Phi^\vee$)

The elements of $\Phi$ are called the roots of the root datum, and the elements of $\Phi^\vee$ are called the coroots.

If $\Phi$ does not contain $2\alpha$ for any $\alpha\in\Phi$, then the root datum is called reduced.

== The root datum of an algebraic group ==
If $G$ is a reductive algebraic group over an algebraically closed field $K$ with a split maximal torus $T$ then its root datum is a quadruple

$$(X^*, \Phi, X_*, \Phi^{\vee})$$,

where

- $X^*$ is the lattice of characters of the maximal torus,
- $X_*$ is the dual lattice (given by the 1-parameter subgroups),
- $\Phi$ is a set of roots,
- $\Phi^{\vee}$ is the corresponding set of coroots.

A connected split reductive algebraic group over $K$ is uniquely determined (up to isomorphism) by its root datum, which is always reduced. Conversely for any root datum there is a reductive algebraic group. A root datum contains slightly more information than the Dynkin diagram, because it also determines the center of the group.

For any root datum $(X^*, \Phi, X_*, \Phi^{\vee})$, we can define a dual root datum $(X_*, \Phi^{\vee},X^*, \Phi)$ by switching the characters with the 1-parameter subgroups, and switching the roots with the coroots.

If $G$ is a connected reductive algebraic group over the algebraically closed field $K$, then its Langlands dual group ${}^L G$ is the complex connected reductive group whose root datum is dual to that of $G$.
