= Demazure module =

Algebraic concept

In mathematics, a Demazure module, introduced by Demazure (1974a, 1974b), is a submodule of a finite-dimensional representation generated by an extremal weight space under the action of a Borel subalgebra. The Demazure character formula, introduced by Demazure (1974b, theorem 2), gives the characters of Demazure modules, and is a generalization of the Weyl character formula. The dimension of a Demazure module is a polynomial in the highest weight, called a Demazure polynomial.

== Demazure modules ==
Suppose that g is a complex semisimple Lie algebra, with a Borel subalgebra b containing a Cartan subalgebra h. An irreducible finite-dimensional representation V of g splits as a sum of eigenspaces of h, and the highest weight space is 1-dimensional and is an eigenspace of b. The Weyl group W acts on the weights of V, and the conjugates wλ of the highest weight vector λ under this action are the extremal weights, whose weight spaces are all 1-dimensional.

A Demazure module is the b-submodule of V generated by the weight space of an extremal vector wλ, so the Demazure submodules of V are parametrized by the Weyl group W.

There are two extreme cases: if w is trivial the Demazure module is just 1-dimensional, and if w is the element of maximal length of W then the Demazure module is the whole of the irreducible representation V.

Demazure modules can be defined in a similar way for highest weight representations of Kac–Moody algebras, except that one now has 2 cases as one can consider the submodules generated by either the Borel subalgebra b or its opposite subalgebra. In the finite-dimensional these are exchanged by the longest element of the Weyl group, but this is no longer the case in infinite dimensions as there is no longest element.

== Demazure character formula ==
=== History ===
The Demazure character formula was introduced by (Demazure 1974b, theorem 2). Victor Kac pointed out that Demazure's proof has a serious gap, as it depends on (Demazure 1974a, Proposition 11, section 2), which is false; see (Joseph 1985, section 4) for Kac's counterexample. Andersen (1985) gave a proof of Demazure's character formula using the work on the geometry of Schubert varieties by Ramanan & Ramanathan (1985) and Mehta & Ramanathan (1985). Joseph (1985) gave a proof for sufficiently large dominant highest weight modules using Lie algebra techniques. Kashiwara (1993) proved a refined version of the Demazure character formula that Littelmann (1995) conjectured (and proved in many cases).

=== Statement ===
The Demazure character formula is

$$\text{Ch}(F(w\lambda)) = \Delta_1\Delta_2\cdots\Delta_ne^\lambda$$

Here:

- w is an element of the Weyl group, with reduced decomposition w = s_{1}...s_{n} as a product of reflections of simple roots.
- λ is a lowest weight, and e^{λ} the corresponding element of the group ring of the weight lattice.
- Ch(F(wλ)) is the character of the Demazure module F(wλ).
- P is the weight lattice, and Z[P] is its group ring.
- $\rho$ is the sum of fundamental weights and the dot action is defined by $w\cdot u=w(u+\rho)-\rho$.
- Δ_{α} for α a root is the endomorphism of the Z-module Z[P] defined by

$$\Delta_\alpha(u) = \frac{u-s_\alpha \cdot  u}{1-e^{-\alpha}}$$
and Δ_{j} is Δ_{α} for α the root of s_{j}
