= Jean Audouze =

French astrophysicist

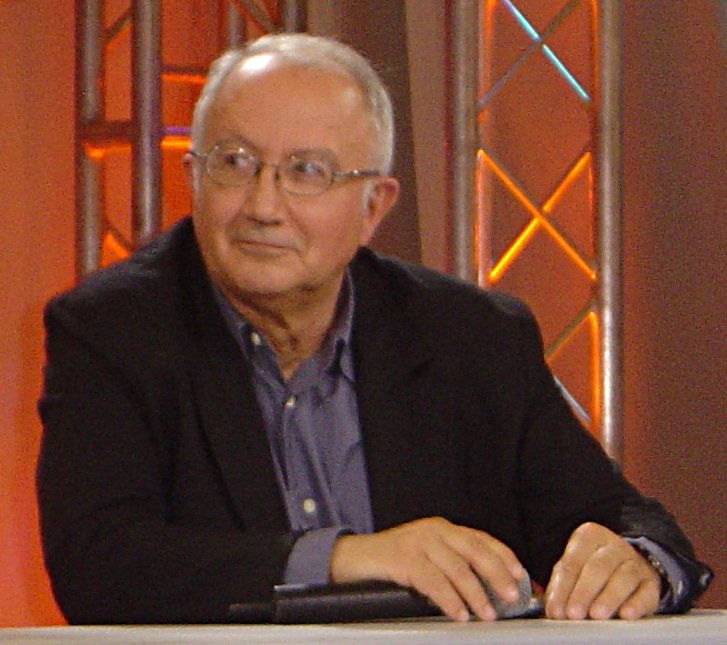
Jean Audouze

Jean Audouze (French: [oduz]) is a French astrophysicist. He is a research director at CNRS and teaches at the Paris Institute of Political Science "Sciences Po". From 1993 to 1996 he was president of the Cité des Sciences et de l'Industrie in La Villette, and in 1998 he was named as director of the Palais de la Découverte, changing places with Michel Demazure who took Audouze's former position at La Villette. Awarded the Kalinga Prize in 2004.
