= Vikraman Balaji =

Indian mathematician

Vikraman Balaji is an Indian mathematician and is currently a professor at Chennai Mathematical Institute. He completed his doctorate in Mathematics under the supervision of C. S. Seshadri. His primary area of research is in algebraic geometry, representation theory and differential geometry. Balaji was awarded the 2006 Shanti Swarup Bhatnagar Award in Mathematical Sciences along with Indranil Biswas "for his outstanding contributions to moduli problems of principal bundles over algebraic varieties, in particular on the Uhlenbeck-Yau compactification of the Moduli Spaces of μ-semistable bundles." He was elected Fellow of the Indian Academy of Sciences in 2007, Fellow of the Indian National Science Academy in 2015 and was awarded the J.C. Bose National Fellowship in 2009.

== Selected publications ==
- Balaji, V (August 1990). "Intermediate Jacobian of Some Moduli Spaces of Vector Bundles on Curves". American Journal of Mathematics. 112 (4): 611–629. doi:10.2307/2374872. JSTOR 2374872.
- V. Balaji; I. Biswas; D. S. Nagaraj (2001). "Principal bundles over projective manifolds with parabolic structure over a divisor". Tohoku Mathematical Journal. 53 (3): 337–367. doi:10.2748/tmj/1178207416.
- Balaji, V (2005). "Principal bundles on projective varieties and the Donaldson-Uhlenbeck compactification". arXiv:math.AG/0505106.
