= Daya-Nand Verma =

Indian mathematician (1933-2012)

Daya-Nand Verma (25 June 1933, Varanasi – 10 June 2012, Mumbai) was a mathematician at the Tata Institute of Fundamental Research during the period 1968-1993. The construction of Verma modules appears in his Ph.D. thesis as a student of Nathan Jacobson at Yale University.

== Select publications ==
- Verma, Daya-Nand (1968), Structure of certain induced representations of complex semisimple Lie algebras, Yale Univ., dissertation, 1966, Bull. Amer. Math. Soc. Volume 74, Number 1, pp. 160–166.
- Verma, Daya-Nand (1971), Möbius inversion for the Bruhat ordering on a Weyl Group, Ann. Sci. Ecole Norm. Sup. 4e Serie, t.4, pp. 393–398.
- J.E.Humphreys and D.N.Verma (1973), Projective Modules for finite Chevalley Groups, Bull. Amer. Math. Soc. Volume 79, pp. 467–468.
- Verma, Daya-Nand (1975), Role of Affine Weyl groups in the representation theory of Chevalley groups and their Lie algebras in Lie Groups and their Representations, ed. I.M.Gelfand, Halsted, New York, pp. 653–705.
