= Indranil Biswas =

Indian mathematician

- Born: 19 October 1964 (age 61)
- Citizenship: Indian
- Education: Tata Institute of Fundamental Research
- Known for: Algebraic geometry, Differential geometry, Several complex variables, Analytic spaces
- Scientific career
- Fields: Mathematics
- Workplaces: Shiv Nadar University

Indranil Biswas (born 19 October 1964) is an Indian mathematician. Currently, He is a senior professor of mathematics at the Shiv Nadar University, Delhi-NCR. He is known for his work in the areas of algebraic geometry, differential geometry, and deformation quantization.

In 2006, the Government of India awarded him the Shanti Swarup Bhatnagar Prize in mathematical sciences for his contributions to "algebraic geometry, centering around moduli problems of vector bundles."

== Biography ==
Biswas is an Indian citizen. He received a Ph.D. in mathematics from the University of Mumbai.

== Selected publications ==
- Biswas, Indranil & Ramanan, S. (1994). "An infinitesimal study of the moduli of Hitchin pairs". Journal of the London Mathematical Society. 49 (2): 219–231. doi:10.1112/jlms/49.2.219.
- Biswas, Indranil (1997). "Parabolic bundles as orbifold bundles". Duke Mathematical Journal. 88 (2): 305–325. doi:10.1215/S0012-7094-97-08812-8.
- Biswas, Indranil (1997). "Parabolic ample bundles". Mathematische Annalen. 307 (3): 511–529. doi:10.1007/s002080050048.
- Anchouche, Boudjemâa; Biswas, Indranil (2001). "Einstein–Hermitian connections on polystable principal bundles over a compact Kähler manifold". American Journal of Mathematics. 123 (2): 207–228. doi:10.1353/ajm.2001.0007. MR 1828221.
- Balaji, Vikraman; Biswas, Indranil; Nagaraj, Donihakkalu S. (2001). "Principal bundles over projective manifolds with parabolic structure over a divisor". Tohoku Mathematical Journal. 53 (3): 337–367. doi:10.2748/tmj/1178207416. MR 1844373.
- Biswas, Indranil; Paranjape, Kapil Hari (2002). "The Hodge Conjecture for general Prym varieties". Journal of Algebraic Geometry. 11 (1): 33–39. arXiv:math/0007192. doi:10.1090/S1056-3911-01-00303-4. MR 1865912.

== Awards and honours ==
- Shanti Swarup Bhatnagar Prize for Science and Technology, 2006.
- Fellow, Indian Academy of Sciences (2003).
