= Good filtration =

In mathematical representation theory, a good filtration is a filtration of a representation of a reductive algebraic group G such that the subquotients are isomorphic to the spaces of sections F(λ) of line bundles λ over G/B for a Borel subgroup B. In characteristic 0 this is automatically true as the irreducible modules are all of the form F(λ), but this is not usually true in positive characteristic. Mathieu (1990) showed that the tensor product of two modules F(λ)⊗F(μ) has a good filtration, completing the results of Donkin (1985) who proved it in most cases and Wang (1982) who proved it in large characteristic. Littelmann (1992) showed that the existence of good filtrations for these tensor products also follows from standard monomial theory.
