= Chitikila Musili =

Indian mathematician

Chitikila Musili was an Indian mathematician at the University of Hyderabad who developed standard monomial theory in collaboration with his PhD supervisor C. S. Seshadri.

== Publications ==
- Musili, C. (1993), Representations of finite groups, Texts and Readings in Mathematics, vol. 3, New Delhi: Hindustan Book Agency, ISBN 9789380250182, MR 1319816
- Musili, C. (2001), Algebraic geometry for beginners, Texts and Readings in Mathematics, vol. 20, New Delhi: Hindustan Book Agency, ISBN 9788185931272, MR 1891705
