= Minuscule representation =

In mathematical representation theory, a minuscule representation of a semisimple Lie algebra or group is an irreducible representation such that the Weyl group acts transitively on the weights. Some authors exclude the trivial representation. A quasi-minuscule representation (also called a basic representation) is an irreducible representation such that all non-zero weights are in the same orbit under the Weyl group; each simple Lie algebra has a unique quasi-minuscule representation that is not minuscule, and the multiplicity of the zero weight is the number of short nodes of the Dynkin diagram. (The highest weight of that quasi-minuscule representation is the highest short root, which in the simply-laced case is also the highest long root, making the quasi-minuscule representation be the adjoint representation.)

The minuscule representations are indexed by the weight lattice modulo the root lattice, or equivalently by irreducible representations of the center of the simply connected compact group. For the simple Lie algebras, the dimensions of the minuscule representations are given as follows.

- A_{n} (^{n+1}_{k}) for 0 ≤ k ≤ n (exterior powers of vector representation). Quasi-minuscule: n^{2}+2n (adjoint)
- B_{n} 1 (trivial), 2^{n} (spin). Quasi-minuscule: 2n+1 (vector)
- C_{n} 1 (trivial), 2n (vector). Quasi-minuscule: 2n^{2}–n–1 if n>1
- D_{n} 1 (trivial), 2n (vector), 2^{n−1} (half spin), 2^{n−1} (half spin). Quasi-minuscule: 2n^{2}–n (adjoint)
- E_{6} 1, 27, 27. Quasi-minuscule: 78 (adjoint)
- E_{7} 1, 56. Quasi-minuscule: 133 (adjoint)
- E_{8} 1. Quasi-minuscule: 248 (adjoint)
- F_{4} 1. Quasi-minuscule: 26
- G_{2} 1. Quasi-minuscule: 7
