= Affine action =

Let $W$ be the Weyl group of a semisimple Lie algebra $\mathfrak{g}$ (associate to fixed choice of a Cartan subalgebra $\mathfrak{h}$). Assume that a set of simple roots in $\mathfrak{h}^*$ is chosen.

The affine action (also called the dot action) of the Weyl group on the space $\mathfrak{h}^*$ is

$$w\cdot \lambda:=w(\lambda+\delta)-\delta$$

where $\delta$ is the sum of all fundamental weights, or, equivalently, the half of the sum of all positive roots.
