= Robert Steinberg =

Jewish Canadian mathematician

Robert Steinberg (May 25, 1922, Soroca, Bessarabia, Romania (present-day Moldova) – May 25, 2014) was a mathematician at the University of California, Los Angeles.

He introduced the Steinberg representation, the Lang–Steinberg theorem, the Steinberg group in algebraic K-theory, Steinberg's formula in representation theory, and the Steinberg groups in Lie theory that yield finite simple groups over finite fields.

== Biography ==
Born in Soroca (then in the Kingdom of Romania, today in Moldova), Steinberg's parents settled in Canada very soon after his birth.

Steinberg studied under Richard Brauer and he received his Ph.D. in mathematics from the University of Toronto in 1948. Steinberg joined the Mathematics Department at UCLA the same year. He retired from UCLA in 1992.

== Awards ==
Steinberg was an invited speaker at the International Congress of Mathematicians in 1966, won the Steele Prize in 1985, was elected to the United States National Academy of Sciences in 1985, and won the Jeffery–Williams Prize in 1990. In 2003, the Journal of Algebra published a special issue to celebrate Robert Steinberg's 80th birthday.

I have had a good life.

– Robert Steinberg

== Selected publications ==
- Steinberg, R. (1951). "A geometric approach to the representations of the full linear group over a Galois field". Transactions of the American Mathematical Society. 71 (2): 274–282. doi:10.1090/s0002-9947-1951-0043784-0. MR 0043784.
- Steinberg, Robert (1959). "Finite reflection groups". Transactions of the American Mathematical Society. 91 (3): 493–504. doi:10.1090/s0002-9947-1959-0106428-2. MR 0106428.
- Steinberg, Robert (1961). "A general Clebsch–Gordan theorem". Bulletin of the American Mathematical Society. 67 (4): 406–407. doi:10.1090/s0002-9904-1961-10644-7. MR 0126508.
- Steinberg, Robert (1962). "Complete sets of representations of algebras". Proceedings of the American Mathematical Society. 13 (5): 746–747. doi:10.1090/s0002-9939-1962-0141710-x. MR 0141710.
- Steinberg, Robert (1962). "A closure property of sets of vectors". Transactions of the American Mathematical Society. 105: 118–125. doi:10.1090/s0002-9947-1962-0165040-x. MR 0165040.
- Steinberg, Robert (1962). "Générateurs, relations et revêtements de groupes algébriques". Colloq. Théorie des Groupes Algébriques (in French). Bruxelles: Gauthier-Villars: 113–127. MR 0153677. Zbl 0272.20036.
- "Differential equations invariant under finite reflections". Transactions of the American Mathematical Society. 112: 392–400. 1964. doi:10.1090/s0002-9947-1964-0167535-3. MR 0167535.
- Steinberg, Robert (2017) [1968], Lectures on Chevalley groups, University Lecture Series, vol. 66, American Mathematical Society, ISBN 978-1-4704-3105-1, MR 0466335
- Steinberg, Robert (1974), Conjugacy classes in algebraic groups, Lecture Notes in Mathematics, vol. 366, Berlin-New York: Springer-Verlag, doi:10.1007/BFb0067854, ISBN 978-3-540-06657-6, MR 0352279
- Steinberg, Robert (1988). "An occurrence of the Robinson–Schensted correspondence". Journal of Algebra. 113 (2): 523–528. doi:10.1016/0021-8693(88)90177-9.
- R. Steinberg, Collected Papers, Amer. Math. Soc. (1997), ISBN 0-8218-0576-2.
