= Multiplicative character =

In mathematics, a multiplicative character (or linear character, or simply character) on a group G is a group homomorphism from G to the multiplicative group of a field (Artin 1966), usually the field of complex numbers. If G is any group, then the set Ch(G) of these morphisms forms an abelian group under pointwise multiplication.

This group is referred to as the character group of G. Sometimes only unitary characters are considered (characters whose image is in the unit circle); other such homomorphisms are then called quasi-characters. Dirichlet characters can be seen as a special case of this definition.

Multiplicative characters are linearly independent, i.e. if $\chi_1, \chi_2, \ldots, \chi_n$ are different characters on a group G then $a_1\chi_1 + a_2\chi_2 + \cdots + a_n\chi_n = 0$ only when $a_1 = a_2 = \cdots = a_n = 0.$

== Examples ==
- Consider the (ax + b)-group

$$G := \left\{ \left. \begin{pmatrix} a & b \\ 0 & 1  \end{pmatrix}\  \right|\  a > 0,\  b \in \mathbf{R} \right\}.$$

Functions f_{u} : G → C such that
$$f_u \left(\begin{pmatrix}
a & b \\
0 & 1  \end{pmatrix}\right)=a^u,$$
where u ranges over complex numbers C are multiplicative characters.

- Consider the multiplicative group of positive real numbers (R^{+},·). Then functions f_{u} : (R^{+},·) → C such that f_{u}(a) = a^{u}, where a is an element of (R^{+}, ·) and u ranges over complex numbers C, are multiplicative characters.
