= Peter Littelmann =

German mathematician

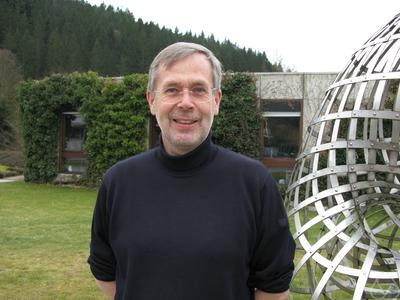
Littelmann at Oberwolfach, 2009

Peter Littelmann (born 10 December 1957) is a German mathematician at the University of Cologne working on algebraic groups and representation theory, who introduced the Littelmann path model and used it to solve several conjectures in standard monomial theory and other areas.

Littelmann was an invited speaker at the International Congress of Mathematicians in Zürich (1994).
