= Parabolic geometry =

Parabolic geometry may refer to:

- Parabolic geometry (differential geometry): The homogeneous space defined by a semisimple Lie group modulo a parabolic subgroup, or the curved analog of such a space
- Euclidean geometry, the geometry of flat space
