= V. Lakshmibai =

Indian American mathematician (1944/1945–2023)

Venkatramani Lakshmibai (1944 – 2 December 2023) was an Indian mathematician who was a professor of mathematics at Northeastern University in Boston. Her research concerned algebraic geometry, the theory of algebraic groups, and representation theory, including in particular the theory of flag varieties and Schubert varieties.

Lakshmibai was born in 1944 in a small town in southern India. She earned her PhD in 1976 from the Tata Institute of Fundamental Research under the direction of C. S. Seshadri. She left India to teach in Europe and then in the United States, where she was a professor at Northeastern University from 1987 to 2019. With Sara Billey she was the co-author of the monograph Singular Loci of Schubert Varieties (Progress in Mathematics 182, Birkhäuser, 2000). She also co-authored two monographs with Justin Brown: Flag Varieties: An Interplay of Geometry, Combinatorics, and Representation Theory (Texts and Readings in Mathematics 53, Hindustan Book Agency, 2009) and The Grassmannian Variety: Geometric and Representation-Theoretic Aspects (Developments in Mathematics 42, Springer, 2015).

In 2012 she was selected as one of the inaugural fellows of the American Mathematical Society.

Lakshmibai died on 2 December 2023, at the age of 78.
