= Crystal base =

Representation of a quantum group

A crystal base for a representation of a quantum group on a $\Q(v)$-vector space is not a base of that vector space but rather a $\Q$-base of $L/vL$ where $L$ is a $\Q(v)$-lattice in that vector space. Crystal bases appeared in the work of Kashiwara (1990) and also in the work of Lusztig (1990). They can be viewed as specializations as $v \to 0$ of the canonical basis defined by Lusztig (1990).

== Definition ==
As a consequence of its defining relations, the quantum group $U_q(G)$ can be regarded as a Hopf algebra over the field of all rational functions of an indeterminate q over $\Q$, denoted $\Q(q)$.

For simple root $\alpha_i$ and non-negative integer $n$, define

$$\begin{align}
e_i^{(0)} = f_i^{(0)} &= 1 \\
e_i^{(n)} &= \frac{e_i^n}{[n]_{q_i}!} \\[6pt]
f_i^{(n)} &= \frac{f_i^n}{[n]_{q_i}!}
\end{align}$$

In an integrable module $M$, and for weight $\lambda$, a vector $u \in M_{\lambda}$ (i.e. a vector $u$ in $M$ with weight $\lambda$) can be uniquely decomposed into the sums

$$u = \sum_{n=0}^\infty f_i^{(n)} u_n = \sum_{n=0}^\infty e_i^{(n)} v_n,$$

where $u_n \in \ker(e_i) \cap M_{\lambda + n \alpha_i}$, $v_n \in \ker(f_i) \cap M_{\lambda - n \alpha_i}$, $u_n \ne 0$ only if $n + \frac{2 (\lambda,\alpha_i)}{(\alpha_i,\alpha_i)} \ge 0$, and $v_n \ne 0$ only if $n - \frac{2 (\lambda,\alpha_i)}{(\alpha_i,\alpha_i)} \ge 0$.

Linear mappings $\tilde{e}_i, \tilde{f}_i : M \to M$ can be defined on $M_\lambda$ by

$$\tilde{e}_i u = \sum_{n=1}^\infty f_i^{(n-1)} u_n = \sum_{n=0}^\infty e_i^{(n+1)} v_n,$$
$$\tilde{f}_i u = \sum_{n=0}^\infty f_i^{(n+1)} u_n = \sum_{n=1}^\infty e_i^{(n-1)} v_n.$$

Let $A$ be the integral domain of all rational functions in $\Q(q)$ which are regular at $q = 0$ (i.e. a rational function $f(q)$ is an element of $A$ if and only if there exist polynomials $g(q)$ and $h(q)$ in the polynomial ring $\Q[q]$ such that $h(0) \ne 0$, and $f(q) = g(q)/h(q)$).

A crystal base for $M$ is an ordered pair $(L,B)$, such that

- $L$ is a free $A$-submodule of $M$ such that $M = \Q(q) \otimes_A L;$
- $B$ is a $\Q$-basis of the vector space $L/qL$ over $\Q,$
- $L = \oplus_\lambda L_\lambda$ and $B = \sqcup_\lambda B_\lambda$, where $L_\lambda = L \cap M_\lambda$ and $B_\lambda = B \cap (L_\lambda/qL_\lambda),$
- $\tilde{e}_i L \subset L$ and $\tilde{f}_i L \subset L \text{ for all } i ,$
- $\tilde{e}_i B \subset B \cup \{0\}$ and $\tilde{f}_i B \subset B \cup \{0\}\text{ for all } i,$
- $\text{for all }b \in B\text{ and }b' \in B,\text{ and for all }i,\quad\tilde{e}_i b = b'\text{ if and only if }\tilde{f}_i b' = b.$

To put this into a more informal setting, the actions of $e_i f_i$ and $f_i e_i$ are generally singular at $q = 0$ on an integrable module $M$. The linear mappings $\tilde{e}_i$ and $\tilde{f}_i$ on the module are introduced so that the actions of $\tilde{e}_i \tilde{f}_i$ and $\tilde{f}_i \tilde{e}_i$ are regular at $q = 0$ on the module. There exists a $\Q(q)$-basis of weight vectors $\tilde{B}$ for $M$, with respect to which the actions of $\tilde{e}_i$ and $\tilde{f}_i$ are regular at $q = 0$ for all i. The module is then restricted to the free $A$-module generated by the basis, and the basis vectors, the $A$-submodule and the actions of $\tilde{e}_i$ and $\tilde{f}_i$ are evaluated at $q = 0$. Furthermore, the basis can be chosen such that at $q = 0$, for all $i$, $\tilde{e}_i$ and $\tilde{f}_i$ are represented by mutual transposes, and map basis vectors to basis vectors or 0.

A crystal base can be represented by a directed graph with labelled edges. Each vertex of the graph represents an element of the $\mathbb Q$-basis $B$ of $L/qL$, and a directed edge, labelled by i, and directed from vertex $v_1$ to vertex $v_2$, represents that $b_2 = \tilde{f}_i b_1$ (and, equivalently, that $b_1 = \tilde{e}_i b_2$), where $b_1$ is the basis element represented by $v_1$, and $b_2$ is the basis element represented by $v_2$. The graph completely determines the actions of $\tilde{e}_i$ and $\tilde{f}_i$ at $q = 0$. If an integrable module has a crystal base, then the module is irreducible if and only if the graph representing the crystal base is connected (a graph is called "connected" if the set of vertices cannot be partitioned into the union of nontrivial disjoint subsets $V_1$ and $V_2$ such that there are no edges joining any vertex in $V_1$ to any vertex in $V_2$).

For any integrable module with a crystal base, the weight spectrum for the crystal base is the same as the weight spectrum for the module, and therefore the weight spectrum for the crystal base is the same as the weight spectrum for the corresponding module of the appropriate Kac–Moody algebra. The multiplicities of the weights in the crystal base are also the same as their multiplicities in the corresponding module of the appropriate Kac–Moody algebra.

It is a theorem of Kashiwara that every integrable highest weight module has a crystal base. Similarly, every integrable lowest weight module has a crystal base.

=== Tensor products of crystal bases ===
Let $M$ be an integrable module with crystal base $(L,B)$ and $M'$ be an integrable module with crystal base $(L',B')$. For crystal bases, the coproduct $\Delta$, given by

$$\begin{align}
\Delta(k_{\lambda}) &= k_\lambda \otimes k_\lambda \\
\Delta(e_i) &= e_i \otimes k_i^{-1} + 1 \otimes e_i \\
\Delta(f_i) &= f_i \otimes 1 + k_i \otimes f_i
\end{align}$$

is adopted. The integrable module $M \otimes_{\Q(q)} M'$ has crystal base $(L \otimes_A L',B \otimes B')$, where $B \otimes B' = \left \{ b \otimes_{\Q} b' : b \in B,\ b' \in B' \right \}$. For a basis vector $b \in B$, define

$$\varepsilon_i(b) = \max \left \{ n \ge 0 : \tilde{e}_i^n b \ne 0 \right \}$$
$$\varphi_i(b) = \max \left \{ n \ge 0 : \tilde{f}_i^n b \ne 0 \right \}$$

The actions of $\tilde{e}_i$ and $\tilde{f}_i$ on $b \otimes b'$ are given by

$$\begin{align}
\tilde{e}_i (b \otimes b') &= \begin{cases} \tilde{e}_i b \otimes b' & \varphi_i(b) \ge \varepsilon_i(b') \\ b \otimes \tilde{e}_i b' & \varphi_i(b) < \varepsilon_i(b') \end{cases} \\
\tilde{f}_i (b \otimes b') &= \begin{cases} \tilde{f}_i b \otimes b' & \varphi_i(b) > \varepsilon_i(b') \\ b \otimes \tilde{f}_i b' & \varphi_i(b) \le \varepsilon_i(b') \end{cases}
\end{align}$$

The decomposition of the product two integrable highest weight modules into irreducible submodules is determined by the decomposition of the graph of the crystal base into its connected components (i.e. the highest weights of the submodules are determined, and the multiplicity of each highest weight is determined).
