= C. S. Seshadri =

Indian mathematician (1932–2020)

C.S. Seshadri
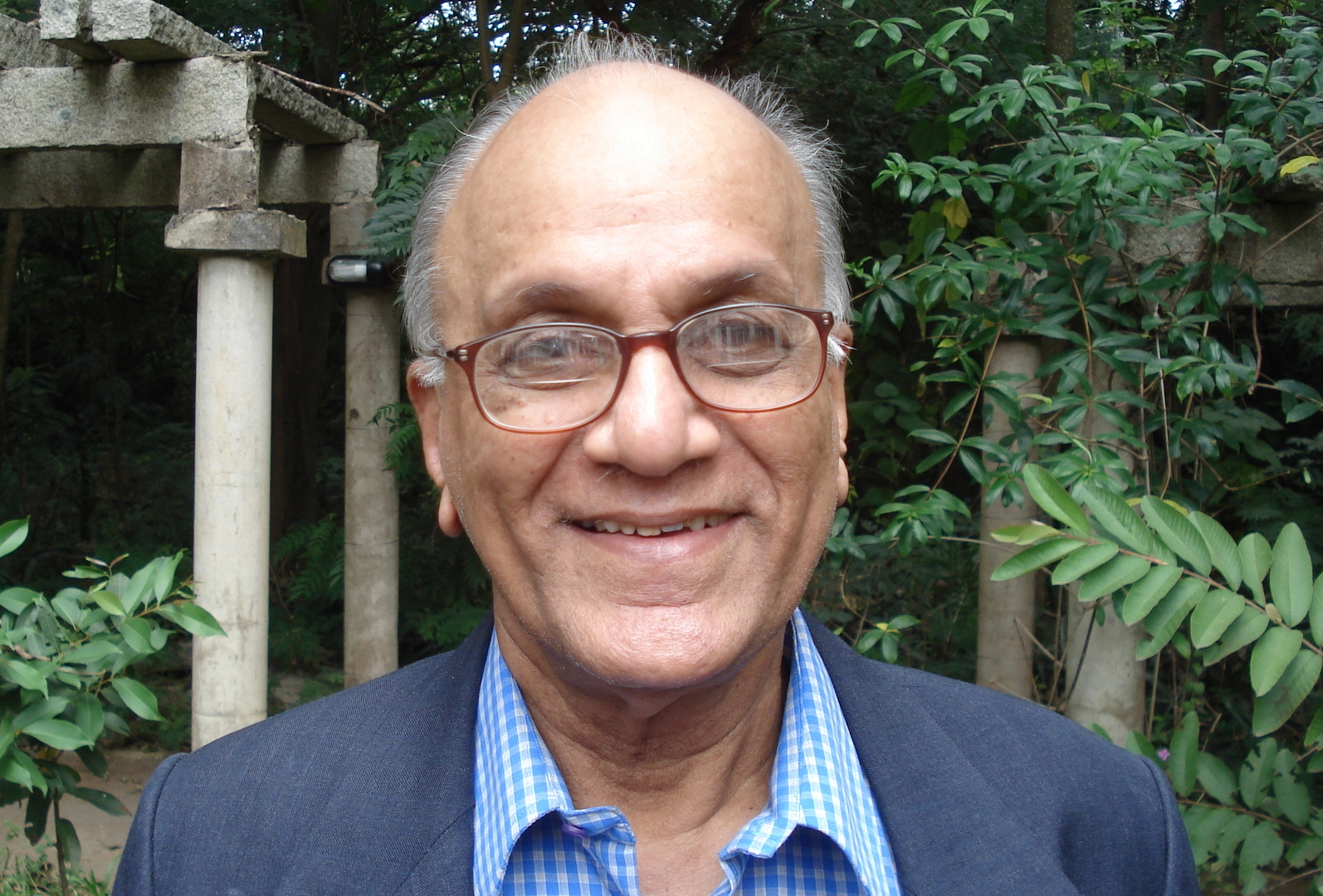
- Seshadri in 2010.
- Born: Conjeevaram Srirangachari Seshadri; 29 February 1932; Conjeevaram, Madras Presidency, British India (now Kanchipuram, Tamil Nadu, India)
- Died: 17 July 2020 (aged 88); Chennai, Tamil Nadu, India
- Known for: Seshadri constant Narasimhan–Seshadri theorem Standard monomial theory
- Awards: Shanti Swarup Bhatnagar Award, Padma Bhushan, Fellow of the Royal Society
- Scientific career
- Fields: Mathematics
- Workplaces: Chennai Mathematical Institute
- Doctoral advisor: K. S. Chandrasekharan
- Doctoral students: Vikraman Balaji, V. Lakshmibai

Conjeevaram Srirangachari Seshadri FRS (29 February 1932 – 17 July 2020), was an Indian mathematician. He was the founder and director-emeritus of the Chennai Mathematical Institute, and is known for his work in algebraic geometry. The Seshadri constant is named after him. He was also known for his collaboration with mathematician M. S. Narasimhan, for their proof of the Narasimhan–Seshadri theorem which proved the necessary conditions for stable vector bundles on a Riemann surface. He also introduced and named the concept called Standard monomial theory.

He was a recipient of the Padma Bhushan in 2009, the third highest civilian honor in the country.

== Degrees and posts ==
Seshadri was born into a Hindu Brahmin family in present-day Kanchipuram, Tamil Nadu. He received his B.A. (Hons) degree in mathematics from Madras University in 1953, and was mentored by the Jesuit priest Fr. Charles Racine and S. Naryanan there. He completed his PhD from Bombay University in 1958 under the supervision of K. S. Chandrasekharan. He was elected Fellow of the Indian Academy in 1971.

Seshadri worked in the School of Mathematics at the Tata Institute of Fundamental Research in Bombay from 1953 to 1984, starting as a Research Scholar and rising to a senior professor. From 1984 to 1989, he worked at the Institute of Mathematical Sciences, Chennai. From 1989 to 2010, he worked as the founding director of the Chennai Mathematical Institute. After stepping down, he continued to be the institute's Director-Emeritus till his death in 2020. He also served on the Mathematical Sciences jury for the Infosys Prize in 2010 and 2011.

== Visiting professorships ==
- University of Paris, France
- Harvard University, Cambridge
- UCLA
- Brandeis University
- University of Bonn, Bonn
- Kyoto University, Kyoto, Japan

He has given talks at the ICM.

== Awards and fellowships ==
- Honorary degree, Université Pierre et Marie Curie (UPMC), Paris, 2013
- Honoris Causa, University of Hyderabad, India
- Padma Bhushan
- Shanti Swarup Bhatnagar Award
- Srinivasa Ramanujan Medal from the Indian Academy of Sciences
- Honorary D.Sc. from Banaras Hindu University
- TWAS Science Award
- Fellow of IAS, INSA and a Fellow of the Royal Society
- Membership of the United States National Academy of Sciences
- Fellow of the American Mathematical Society, 2012

== Research work ==
Seshadri's main work was in algebraic geometry. His work with M S Narasimhan on unitary vector bundles and the Narasimhan–Seshadri theorem has influenced the field. His work on Geometric Invariant Theory and on Schubert varieties, in particular his introduction of standard monomial theory, is widely recognized.

== Publications ==
- Narasimhan, M. S.; Seshadri, C. S. (1965). "Stable and unitary vector bundles on a compact Riemann surface". Annals of Mathematics. 82 (3). The Annals of Mathematics, Vol. 82, No. 3: 540–567. doi:10.2307/1970710. JSTOR 1970710. MR 0184252.
- Seshadri, C. S. (2007), Introduction to the theory of standard monomials, Texts and Readings in Mathematics, vol. 46, New Delhi: Hindustan Book Agency, ISBN 9788185931784, MR 2347272
- Seshadri, C.S. (2010). Studies in the History of Indian Mathematics. New Delhi: Hindustan Book Agency. ISBN 9789380250069.
- Seshadri, C. S. (2012), Collected papers of C. S. Seshadri. Volume 1. Vector bundles and invariant theory, New Delhi: Hindustan Book Agency, ISBN 9789380250175, MR 2905897
- Seshadri, C. S. (2012), Collected papers of C. S. Seshadri. Volume 2. Schubert geometry and representation theory., New Delhi: Hindustan Book Agency, ISBN 9789380250175, MR 2905898
