= Weight (representation theory) =

Concept in Lie algebra representation theory

In the mathematical field of representation theory, the concept of weights of an algebra A over a field F is a generalisation of that of eigenvalues. They are algebra homomorphisms from A to F, or equivalently, one-dimensional representations of A over F. It is the algebra analogue of a multiplicative character of a group. The importance of the concept, however, stems from its application to representations of Lie algebras and hence also to representations of algebraic and Lie groups. In this context, a weight of a representation is a generalization of the notion of an eigenvalue, and the corresponding eigenspace is called a weight space.

== Motivation and general concept ==
Given a set S of $n \times n$ matrices over the same field, each of which is diagonalizable, and any two of which commute, it is always possible to simultaneously diagonalize all of the elements of S. (Note: In fact, given a set of commuting matrices over an algebraically closed field, they are simultaneously triangularizable, without needing to assume that they are diagonalizable.) Equivalently, for any set S of mutually commuting semisimple linear transformations of a finite-dimensional vector space V there exists a basis of V consisting of simultaneous eigenvectors of all elements of S. Each of these common eigenvectors v ∈ V defines a linear functional on the subalgebra U of End(V ) generated by the set of endomorphisms S; this functional is defined as the map which associates to each element of U its eigenvalue on the eigenvector v. This map is also multiplicative, and sends the identity to 1; thus it is an algebra homomorphism from U to the base field. This "generalized eigenvalue" is a prototype for the notion of a weight.

The notion is closely related to the idea of a multiplicative character in group theory, which is a homomorphism χ from a group G to the multiplicative group of a field F. Thus χ: G → F^{×} satisfies χ(e) = 1 (where e is the identity element of G) and
$$\chi(gh) = \chi(g)\chi(h) \ \text{ for all } g, h \in G.$$
Indeed, if G acts on a vector space V over F, each simultaneous eigenspace for every element of G, if such exists, determines a multiplicative character on G: the eigenvalue on this common eigenspace of each element of the group.

The notion of multiplicative character can be extended to any algebra A over F, by replacing χ: G → F^{×} by a linear map χ: A → F with:
$$\chi(ab) = \chi(a)\chi(b)$$
for all a, b in A. If an algebra A acts on a vector space V over F to any simultaneous eigenspace, this corresponds an algebra homomorphism from A to F assigning to each element of A its eigenvalue.

If A is a Lie algebra (a non‑associative algebra with a bilinear, antisymmetric bracket satisfying the Jacobi identity), then instead of requiring multiplicativity of a character, one requires that it maps any Lie bracket to the corresponding commutator; but since F is commutative this simply means that this map must vanish on Lie brackets: χ([a,b]) = 0. A weight on a Lie algebra g over a field F is a linear map λ: g → F with λ([x, y]) = 0 for all x, y in g. Any weight on a Lie algebra g vanishes on the derived algebra [g,g] and hence descends to a weight on the abelian Lie algebra g/[g,g]. Thus weights are primarily of interest for abelian Lie algebras, where they reduce to the simple notion of a generalized eigenvalue for space of commuting linear transformations.

If G is a Lie group or an algebraic group, then a multiplicative character θ: G → F^{×} induces a weight χ = dθ: g → F on its Lie algebra by differentiation. (For Lie groups, this is differentiation at the identity element of G, and the algebraic group case is an abstraction using the notion of a derivation.)

== Weights in the representation theory of semisimple Lie algebras ==
Let $\mathfrak g$ be a complex semisimple Lie algebra and $\mathfrak h$ a Cartan subalgebra of $\mathfrak g$. In this section, we describe the concepts needed to formulate the "theorem of the highest weight" classifying the finite-dimensional representations of $\mathfrak g$. Notably, we will explain the notion of a "dominant integral element." The representations themselves are described in the article linked to above.

=== Weight of a representation ===
Example of the weights of a representation of the Lie algebra sl(3,C)

Let $\sigma : \mathfrak{g} \to \operatorname{End}(V)$ be a representation of a Lie algebra $\mathfrak g$ on a vector space V over a field of characteristic 0, say $\mathbb{C}$, and let $\lambda : \mathfrak{h} \to \mathbb{C}$ be a linear functional on $\mathfrak h$, where $\mathfrak h$ is a Cartan subalgebra of $\mathfrak g$. Then the weight space of V with weight λ is the subspace $V_\lambda$ given by
$$V_\lambda:=\{v\in V: \forall H\in \mathfrak{h},\, (\sigma(H))(v)=\lambda(H)v\}.$$
A weight of the representation V (the representation is often referred to in short by the vector space V over which elements of the Lie algebra act rather than the map $\sigma$) is a linear functional λ such that the corresponding weight space is nonzero. Nonzero elements of the weight space are called weight vectors. That is to say, a weight vector is a simultaneous eigenvector for the action of the elements of $\mathfrak h$, with the corresponding eigenvalues given by λ.

If V is the direct sum of its weight spaces
$$V = \bigoplus_{\lambda\in\mathfrak{h}^*} V_\lambda$$
then V is called a weight module; this corresponds to there being a common eigenbasis (a basis of simultaneous eigenvectors) for all the represented elements of the algebra, i.e., to there being simultaneously diagonalizable matrices (see diagonalizable matrix).

If G is a Lie group with Lie algebra $\mathfrak g$, every finite-dimensional representation of G induces a representation of $\mathfrak g$. A weight of the representation of G is then simply a weight of the associated representation of $\mathfrak g$. There is a subtle distinction between weights of group representations and Lie algebra representations, which is that there is a different notion of integrality condition in the two cases; see below. (The integrality condition is more restrictive in the group case, reflecting that not every representation of the Lie algebra comes from a representation of the group.)

=== Action of the root vectors ===
For the adjoint representation $\mathrm{ad} : \mathfrak{g}\to \operatorname{End}(\mathfrak{g})$ of $\mathfrak g$, the space over which the representation acts is the Lie algebra itself. Then the nonzero weights are called roots, the weight spaces are called root spaces, and the weight vectors, which are thus elements of $\mathfrak{g}$, are called root vectors. Explicitly, a linear functional $\alpha$ on the Cartan subalgebra $\mathfrak h$ is called a root if $\alpha\neq 0$ and there exists a nonzero $X$ in $\mathfrak g$ such that
$$[H,X] = \alpha(H)X$$
for all $H$ in $\mathfrak h$. The collection of roots forms a root system.

From the perspective of representation theory, the significance of the roots and root vectors is the following elementary but important result: If $\sigma : \mathfrak{g} \to \operatorname{End}(V)$ is a representation of $\mathfrak g$, v is a weight vector with weight $\lambda$ and X is a root vector with root $\alpha$, then
$$\sigma(H)(\sigma(X)(v))=[(\lambda+\alpha)(H)](\sigma(X)(v))$$
for all H in $\mathfrak h$. That is, $\sigma(X)(v)$ is either the zero vector or a weight vector with weight $\lambda+\alpha$. Thus, the action of $X$ maps the weight space with weight $\lambda$ into the weight space with weight $\lambda+\alpha$.

For example, if $\mathfrak{g}=\mathfrak{su}_{\mathbb{C}}(2)$, or $\mathfrak{su}(2)$ complexified, the root vectors ${H,X,Y}$ span the algebra and have weights $0$, $1$, and $-1$ respectively. The Cartan subalgebra is spanned by $H$, and the action of $H$ classifies the weight spaces. The action of $X$ maps a weight space of weight $\lambda$ to the weight space of weight $\lambda+1$ and the action of $Y$ maps a weight space of weight $\lambda$ to the weight space of weight $\lambda-1$, and the action of $H$ maps the weight spaces to themselves. In the fundamental representation, with weights $\pm\frac{1}{2}$ and weight spaces $V_{\pm\frac{1}{2}}$, $X$ maps $V_{+\frac{1}{2}}$ to zero and $V_{-\frac{1}{2}}$ to $V_{+\frac{1}{2}}$, while $Y$ maps $V_{-\frac{1}{2}}$ to zero and $V_{+\frac{1}{2}}$ to $V_{-\frac{1}{2}}$, and $H$ maps each weight space to itself.

=== Integral element ===
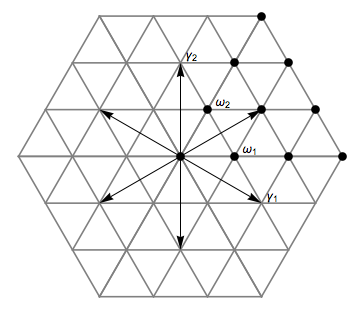
Algebraically integral elements (triangular lattice), dominant integral elements (black dots), and fundamental weights for sl(3,C)

Let $\mathfrak h^*_0$ be the real subspace of $\mathfrak h^*$ generated by the roots of $\mathfrak g$, where $\mathfrak h^*$ is the space of linear functionals $\lambda : \mathfrak h \to \mathbb C$, the dual space to $\mathfrak h$. For computations, it is convenient to choose an inner product that is invariant under the Weyl group, that is, under reflections about the hyperplanes orthogonal to the roots. We may then use this inner product to identify $\mathfrak h^*_0$ with a subspace $\mathfrak h_0$ of $\mathfrak h$. With this identification, the coroot associated to a root $\alpha$ is given as
$$H_\alpha = 2\frac{\alpha}{(\alpha,\alpha)}$$
where $(\alpha,\beta)$ denotes the inner product of vectors $\alpha,\beta.$ In addition to this inner product, it is common for an angle bracket notation $\langle\cdot,\cdot\rangle$ to be used in discussions of root systems, with the angle bracket defined as $\langle\lambda,\alpha\rangle\equiv(\lambda,H_\alpha).$ The angle bracket here is not an inner product, as it is not symmetric, and is linear only in the first argument. The angle bracket notation should not be confused with the inner product $(\cdot,\cdot).$

We now define two different notions of integrality for elements of $\mathfrak h_0$. The motivation for these definitions is simple: The weights of finite-dimensional representations of $\mathfrak g$ satisfy the first integrality condition, while if G is a group with Lie algebra $\mathfrak g$, the weights of finite-dimensional representations of G satisfy the second integrality condition.

An element $\lambda\in\mathfrak h_0$ is algebraically integral if
$$(\lambda,H_\alpha)=2\frac{(\lambda,\alpha)}{(\alpha,\alpha)}\in\mathbb{Z}$$
for all roots $\alpha$. The motivation for this condition is that the coroot $H_\alpha$ can be identified with the H element in a standard ${X,Y,H}$ basis for an $sl(2,\mathbb C)$-subalgebra of $\mathfrak g$. By elementary results for $sl(2,\mathbb C)$, the eigenvalues of $H_\alpha$ in any finite-dimensional representation must be an integer. We conclude that, as stated above, the weight of any finite-dimensional representation of $\mathfrak g$ is algebraically integral.

The fundamental weights $\omega_1,\ldots,\omega_n$ are defined by the property that they form a basis of $\mathfrak h_0$ dual to the set of coroots associated to the simple roots. That is, the fundamental weights are defined by the condition
$$2\frac{(\omega_i,\alpha_j)}{(\alpha_j,\alpha_j)}=\delta_{i,j}$$
where $\alpha_1, \ldots, \alpha_n$ are the simple roots. An element $\lambda$ is then algebraically integral if and only if it is an integral combination of the fundamental weights. The set of all $\mathfrak g$-integral weights is a lattice in $\mathfrak h_0$ called the weight lattice for $\mathfrak g$, denoted by $P(\mathfrak g)$.

The figure shows the example of the Lie algebra $sl(3,\mathbb C)$, whose root system is the $A_2$ root system. There are two simple roots, $\gamma_1$ and $\gamma_2$. The first fundamental weight, $\omega_1$, should be orthogonal to $\gamma_2$ and should project orthogonally to half of $\gamma_1$, and similarly for $\omega_2$. The weight lattice is then the triangular lattice.

Suppose now that the Lie algebra $\mathfrak g$ is the Lie algebra of a Lie group G. Then we say that $\lambda\in\mathfrak h_0$ is analytically integral (G-integral) if for each t in $\mathfrak h$ such that $\exp(t)=1\in G$ we have $(\lambda,t)\in 2\pi i \mathbb{Z}$. The reason for making this definition is that if a representation of $\mathfrak g$ arises from a representation of G, then the weights of the representation will be G-integral. For G semisimple, the set of all G-integral weights is a sublattice P(G) ⊂ P($\mathfrak g$). If G is simply connected, then P(G) = P($\mathfrak g$). If G is not simply connected, then the lattice P(G) is smaller than P($\mathfrak g$) and their quotient is isomorphic to the fundamental group of G.

=== Partial ordering on the space of weights ===
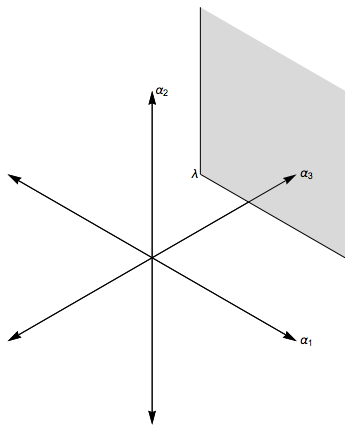
If the positive roots are $\alpha_1$, $\alpha_2$, and $\alpha_3$, the shaded region is the set of points higher than $\lambda$

We now introduce a partial ordering on the set of weights, which will be used to formulate the theorem of the highest weight describing the representations of $\mathfrak g$. Recall that R is the set of roots; we now fix a set $R^+$ of positive roots.

Consider two elements $\mu$ and $\lambda$ of $\mathfrak h_0$. We are mainly interested in the case where $\mu$ and $\lambda$ are integral, but this assumption is not necessary to the definition we are about to introduce. We then say that $\mu$ is higher than $\lambda$, which we write as $\mu\succeq\lambda$, if $\mu-\lambda$ is expressible as a linear combination of positive roots with non-negative real coefficients. This means, roughly, that "higher" means in the directions of the positive roots. We equivalently say that $\lambda$ is "lower" than $\mu$, which we write as $\lambda \preceq \mu$.

This is only a partial ordering; it can easily happen that $\mu$ is neither higher nor lower than $\lambda$.

=== Dominant weight ===
An integral element $\lambda$ is dominant if $(\lambda,\gamma)\geq 0$ for each positive root $\gamma$. Equivalently, $\lambda$ is dominant if it is a non-negative integer combination of the fundamental weights. In the $A_2$ case, the dominant integral elements live in a 60-degree sector. The notion of being dominant is not the same as being higher than zero. Note the grey area in the picture on the right is a 120-degree sector, strictly containing the 60-degree sector corresponding to the dominant integral elements.

The set of all λ (not necessarily integral) such that $(\lambda,\gamma)\geq 0$ for all positive roots $\gamma$ is known as the fundamental Weyl chamber associated to the given set of positive roots.

=== Theorem of the highest weight ===
A weight $\lambda$ of a representation $V$ of $\mathfrak g$ is called a highest weight if every other weight of $V$ is lower than $\lambda$.

The theory classifying the finite-dimensional irreducible representations of $\mathfrak g$ is by means of a "theorem of the highest weight." The theorem says that

1. every irreducible (finite-dimensional) representation has a highest weight,
2. the highest weight is always a dominant, algebraically integral element,
3. two irreducible representations with the same highest weight are isomorphic, and
4. every dominant, algebraically integral element is the highest weight of an irreducible representation.

The last point is the most difficult one; the representations may be constructed using Verma modules.

=== Highest-weight module ===
A representation (not necessarily finite dimensional) V of $\mathfrak g$ is called highest-weight module if it is generated by a weight vector v ∈ V that is annihilated by the action of all positive root spaces in $\mathfrak g$. Every irreducible $\mathfrak g$-module with a highest weight is necessarily a highest-weight module, but in the infinite-dimensional case, a highest weight module need not be irreducible. For each $\lambda\in\mathfrak h^*$—not necessarily dominant or integral—there exists a unique (up to isomorphism) simple highest-weight $\mathfrak g$-module with highest weight λ, which is denoted L(λ), but this module is infinite dimensional unless λ is dominant integral. It can be shown that each highest weight module with highest weight λ is a quotient of the Verma module M(λ). This is just a restatement of universality property in the definition of a Verma module.

Every finite-dimensional highest weight module is irreducible.

== See also ==
- Classifying finite-dimensional representations of Lie algebras
- Representation theory of a connected compact Lie group
- Highest-weight category
- Root system
