= Root system =

Geometric arrangements of points, foundational to Lie theory

In mathematics, a root system is a configuration of vectors in a Euclidean space satisfying certain geometrical properties. The concept is fundamental in the theory of Lie groups and Lie algebras, especially the classification and representation theory of semisimple Lie algebras. Since Lie groups (and some analogues such as algebraic groups) and Lie algebras have become important in many parts of mathematics during the twentieth century, the apparently special nature of root systems belies the number of areas in which they are applied. Further, the classification scheme for root systems, by Dynkin diagrams, occurs in parts of mathematics with no overt connection to Lie theory (such as singularity theory). Finally, root systems are important for their own sake, as in spectral graph theory.

== Definitions and examples ==
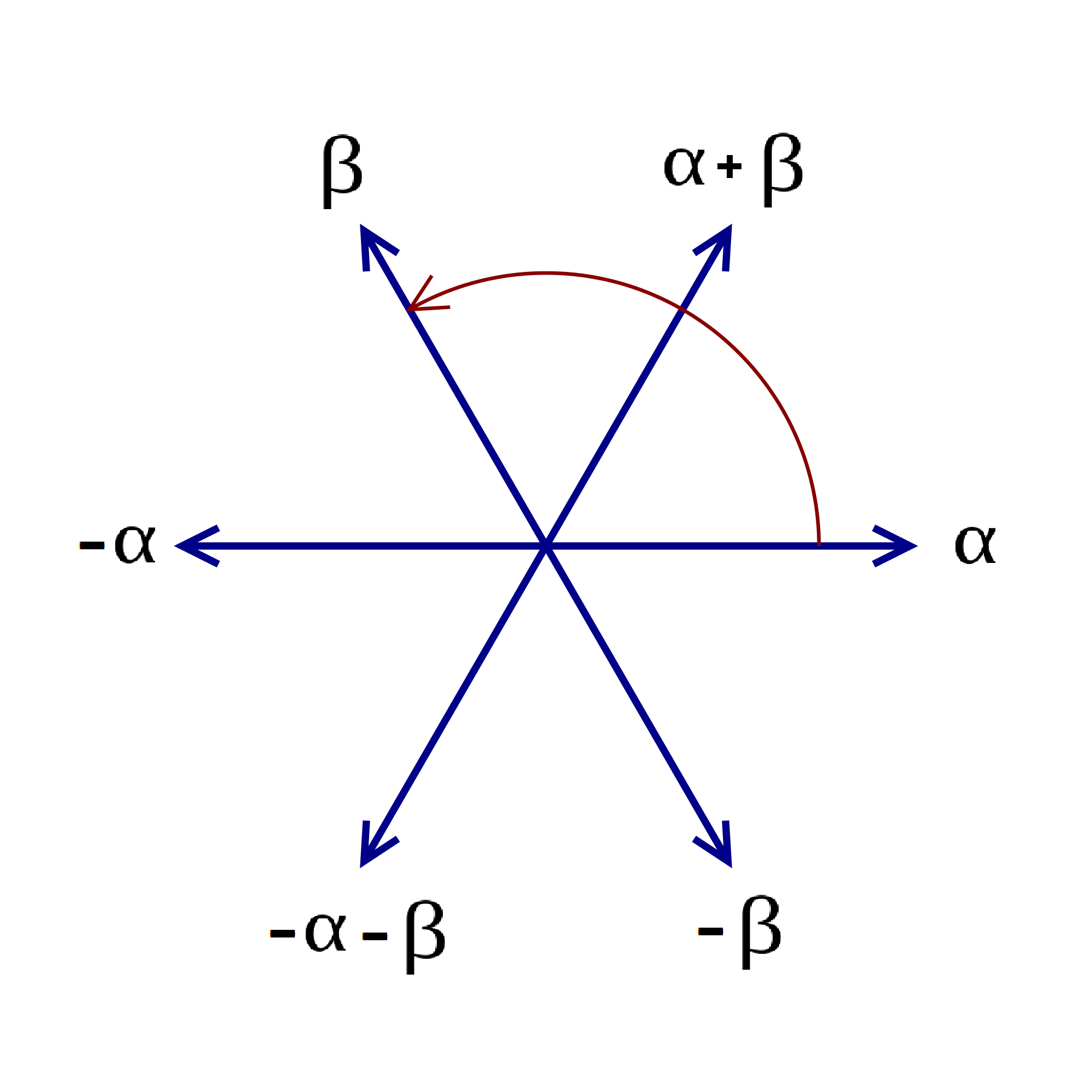
The six vectors of the root system A_{2}

As a first example, consider the six vectors in 2-dimensional Euclidean space, R^{2}, as shown in the image at the right; call them roots. These vectors span the whole space. If you consider the line through the origin perpendicular to any root, say β, then the reflection of R^{2} in that line sends any other root, say α, to another root. Moreover, the root to which it is sent equals α + nβ, where n is an integer (in this case, n equals 1). These six vectors satisfy the following definition, and therefore they form a root system; this one is known as A_{2}.

=== Definition ===
Let E be a finite-dimensional Euclidean vector space, with the standard Euclidean inner product denoted by $(\cdot,\cdot)$. A root system $\Phi$ in E is a finite set of non-zero vectors (called roots) that satisfy the following conditions:

1. The roots span E.
2. The only scalar multiples of a root $\alpha\in\Phi$ that belong to $\Phi$ are $\alpha$ itself and $-\alpha$.
3. For every root $\alpha\in\Phi$, the set $\Phi$ is closed under reflection through the hyperplane perpendicular to $\alpha$.
4. (Integrality) If $\alpha$ and $\beta$ are roots in $\Phi$, then the projection of $\beta$ onto the line through $\alpha$ is an integer or half-integer multiple of $\alpha$.

Equivalent ways of writing conditions 3 and 4, respectively, are as follows:

3. For any two roots $\alpha,\beta \in \Phi$, the set $\Phi$ contains the element $\sigma_\alpha(\beta):=\beta-2\frac{(\alpha,\beta)}{(\alpha,\alpha)}\alpha.$
4. For any two roots $\alpha,\beta\in\Phi$, the number $\langle \beta, \alpha \rangle := 2 \frac{(\alpha,\beta)}{(\alpha,\alpha)}$ is an integer.

Some authors only include conditions 1–3 in the definition of a root system. In this context, a root system that also satisfies the integrality condition is known as a crystallographic root system. Other authors omit condition 2; then they call root systems satisfying condition 2 reduced. In this article, all root systems are assumed to be reduced and crystallographic.

In view of property 3, the integrality condition is equivalent to stating that β and its reflection σ_{α}(β) differ by an integer multiple of α. Note that the operator
$$\langle \cdot, \cdot \rangle \colon \Phi \times \Phi \to \mathbb{Z}$$
defined by property 4 is not an inner product. It is not necessarily symmetric and is linear only in the first argument.

Rank-2 root systems
| Root system A1 + A1 | Root system D2 |
| Root system $A_1 \times A_1$ | Root system $D_2$ |
| Root system A2 | Root system G2 |
| Root system $A_2$ | Root system $G_2$ |
| Root system B2 | Root system C2 |
| Root system $B_2$ | Root system $C_2$ |

The rank of a root system Φ is the dimension of E. Two root systems may be combined by regarding the Euclidean spaces they span as mutually orthogonal subspaces of a common Euclidean space. A root system which does not arise from such a combination, such as the systems A_{2}, B_{2}, and G_{2} pictured to the right, is said to be irreducible.

Two root systems (E_{1}, Φ_{1}) and (E_{2}, Φ_{2}) are called isomorphic if there is an invertible linear transformation E_{1} → E_{2} which sends Φ_{1} to Φ_{2} such that for each pair of roots, the number $\langle x, y \rangle$ is preserved.

The root lattice of a root system Φ is the Z-submodule of E generated by Φ. It is a lattice in E.

=== Weyl group ===
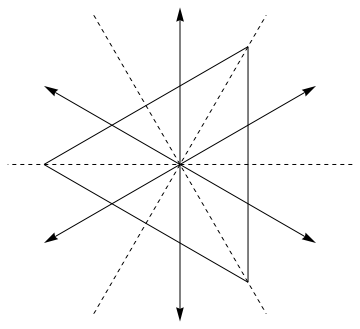
The Weyl group of the $A_2$ root system is the symmetry group of an equilateral triangle

The group of isometries of E generated by reflections through hyperplanes associated to the roots of Φ is called the Weyl group of Φ. As it acts faithfully on the finite set Φ, the Weyl group is always finite. The reflection planes are the hyperplanes perpendicular to the roots, indicated for $A_2$ by dashed lines in the figure below. The Weyl group is the symmetry group of an equilateral triangle, which has six elements. In this case, the Weyl group is not the full symmetry group of the root system (e.g., a 60-degree rotation is a symmetry of the root system but not an element of the Weyl group).

=== Rank one example ===
There is only one root system of rank 1, consisting of two nonzero vectors $\{\alpha, -\alpha\}$. This root system is called $A_1$.

=== Rank two examples ===
In rank 2 there are four possibilities, corresponding to $\sigma_\alpha(\beta) = \beta + n\alpha$, where $n = 0, 1, 2, 3$. The figure at right shows these possibilities, but with some redundancies: $A_1\times A_1$ is isomorphic to $D_2$ and $B_2$ is isomorphic to $C_2$.

Note that a root system is not determined by the lattice that it generates: $A_1 \times A_1$ and $B_2$ both generate a square lattice while $A_2$ and $G_2$ both generate a hexagonal lattice.

Whenever Φ is a root system in E, and S is a subspace of E spanned by Ψ = Φ ∩ S, then Ψ is a root system in S. Thus, the exhaustive list of four root systems of rank 2 shows the geometric possibilities for any two roots chosen from a root system of arbitrary rank. In particular, two such roots must meet at an angle of 0, 30, 45, 60, 90, 120, 135, 150, or 180 degrees.

=== Root systems arising from semisimple Lie algebras ===
If $\mathfrak{g}$ is a complex semisimple Lie algebra and $\mathfrak{h}$ is a Cartan subalgebra, we can construct a root system as follows. We say that $\alpha\in\mathfrak{h}^*$ is a root of $\mathfrak{g}$ relative to $\mathfrak{h}$ if $\alpha\neq 0$ and there exists some $X\neq 0\in\mathfrak{g}$ such that
$$[H,X]=\alpha(H)X$$
for all $H\in\mathfrak{h}$. One can show that there is an inner product for which the set of roots forms a root system. The root system of $\mathfrak{g}$ is a fundamental tool for analyzing the structure of $\mathfrak{g}$ and classifying its representations. (See the section below on Root systems and Lie theory.)

== History ==
The concept of a root system was originally introduced by Wilhelm Killing around 1889 (in German, Wurzelsystem). He used them in his attempt to classify all simple Lie algebras over the field of complex numbers. (Killing originally made a mistake in the classification, listing two exceptional rank 4 root systems, when in fact there is only one, now known as F_{4}. Cartan later corrected this mistake, by showing Killing's two root systems were isomorphic.)

Killing investigated the structure of a Lie algebra $L$ by considering what is now called a Cartan subalgebra $\mathfrak{h}$. Then he studied the roots of the characteristic polynomial $\det (\operatorname{ad}_L x - t)$, where $x \in \mathfrak{h}$. Here a root is considered as a function of $\mathfrak{h}$, or indeed as an element of the dual vector space $\mathfrak{h}^*$. This set of roots forms a root system inside $\mathfrak{h}^*$, as defined above, where the inner product is the Killing form.

== Elementary consequences of the root system axioms ==
The integrality condition for $\langle\beta, \alpha \rangle$ is fulfilled only for β on one of the vertical lines, while the integrality condition for $\langle\alpha, \beta \rangle$ is fulfilled only for β on one of the red circles. Any β perpendicular to α (on the Y axis) trivially fulfills both with 0, but does not define an irreducible root system. Modulo reflection, for a given α there are only 5 nontrivial possibilities for β, and 3 possible angles between α and β in a set of simple roots. Subscript letters correspond to the series of root systems for which the given β can serve as the first root and α as the second root (or in F_{4} as the middle 2 roots).

The cosine of the angle between two roots is constrained to be one-half of the square root of a positive integer. This is because $\langle \beta, \alpha \rangle$ and $\langle \alpha, \beta \rangle$ are both integers, by assumption, and
$$\begin{align}
\langle \beta, \alpha \rangle  \langle \alpha, \beta \rangle
&= 2 \frac{(\alpha,\beta)}{(\alpha,\alpha)} \cdot 2 \frac{(\alpha,\beta)}{(\beta,\beta)} \\
&= 4 \frac{(\alpha,\beta)^2}{\vert \alpha \vert^2 \vert \beta \vert^2} \\
&= 4 \cos^2(\theta)\\
&= (2\cos(\theta))^2 \in \mathbb{Z}.
\end{align}$$

Since $2\cos(\theta) \in [-2,2]$, the only possible values for $\cos(\theta)$ are $0, \pm \tfrac{1}{2}, \pm\tfrac{\sqrt{2}}{2}, \pm\tfrac{\sqrt{3}}{2}$ and $\pm\tfrac{\sqrt{4}}{2} = \pm 1$, corresponding to angles of 90°, 60° or 120°, 45° or 135°, 30° or 150°, and 0° or 180°. Condition 2 says that no scalar multiples of α other than 1 and −1 can be roots, so 0 or 180°, which would correspond to 2α or −2α, are out. The diagram at right shows that an angle of 60° or 120° corresponds to roots of equal length, while an angle of 45° or 135° corresponds to a length ratio of $\sqrt{2}$ and an angle of 30° or 150° corresponds to a length ratio of $\sqrt{3}$.

In summary, here are the only possibilities for each pair of roots.

- Angle of 90 degrees; in that case, the length ratio is unrestricted.
- Angle of 60 or 120 degrees, with a length ratio of 1.
- Angle of 45 or 135 degrees, with a length ratio of $\sqrt 2$.
- Angle of 30 or 150 degrees, with a length ratio of $\sqrt 3$.

== Positive roots and simple roots ==
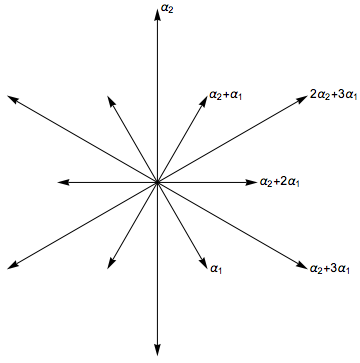
The labeled roots are a set of positive roots for the $G_2$ root system, with $\alpha_1$ and $\alpha_2$ being the simple roots

Given a root system $\Phi$ we can always choose (in many ways) a set of positive roots. This is a subset $\Phi^+$ of $\Phi$ such that

- For each root $\alpha\in\Phi$ exactly one of the roots $\alpha$, $-\alpha$ is contained in $\Phi^+$.
- For any two distinct $\alpha, \beta\in \Phi^+$ such that $\alpha+\beta$ is a root, $\alpha+\beta\in\Phi^+$.

If a set of positive roots $\Phi^+$ is chosen, elements of $-\Phi^+$ are called negative roots. A set of positive roots may be constructed by choosing a hyperplane $V$ not containing any root and setting $\Phi^+$ to be all the roots lying on a fixed side of $V$. Furthermore, every set of positive roots arises in this way.

An element of $\Phi^+$ is called a simple root (also fundamental root) if it cannot be written as the sum of two elements of $\Phi^+$. (The set of simple roots is also referred to as a base for $\Phi$.) The set $\Delta$ of simple roots is a basis of $E$ with the following additional special properties:

- Every root $\alpha\in\Phi$ is a linear combination of elements of $\Delta$ with integer coefficients.
- For each $\alpha\in\Phi$, the coefficients in the previous point are either all non-negative or all non-positive.

For each root system $\Phi$ there are many different choices of the set of positive roots—or, equivalently, of the simple roots—but any two sets of positive roots differ by the action of the Weyl group.

== Dual root system, coroots, and integral elements ==
=== The dual root system ===
If Φ is a root system in E, the coroot α^{∨} of a root α is defined by
$$\alpha^\vee= {2\over (\alpha,\alpha)}\, \alpha.$$

The set of coroots also forms a root system Φ^{∨} in E, called the dual root system (or sometimes inverse root system). By direct calculation, α^{∨∨} = α, so that Φ is the dual root system of Φ^{∨}. The lattice in E spanned by Φ^{∨} is called the coroot lattice. Both Φ and Φ^{∨} have the same Weyl group W and, for s in W,
$$(s\alpha)^\vee= s(\alpha^\vee).$$

If Δ is a set of simple roots for Φ, then Δ^{∨} is a set of simple roots for Φ^{∨}.

In the classification described below, the root systems of type $A_n$ and $D_n$ along with the exceptional root systems $E_6,E_7,E_8,F_4,G_2$ are all self-dual, meaning that the dual root system is isomorphic to the original root system. By contrast, the $B_n$ and $C_n$ root systems are dual to one another, but not isomorphic (except when $n=2$).

=== Integral elements ===
A vector $\lambda$ in E is called integral if its inner product with each coroot is an integer:
$$2\frac{(\lambda,\alpha)}{(\alpha,\alpha)}\in\mathbb Z,\quad\alpha\in\Phi.$$
Since the set of $\alpha^\vee$ with $\alpha\in\Delta$ forms a base for the dual root system, to verify that $\lambda$ is integral, it suffices to check the above condition for $\alpha\in\Delta$.

The set of integral elements is called the weight lattice associated to the given root system. This term comes from the representation theory of semisimple Lie algebras, where the integral elements form the possible weights of finite-dimensional representations.

The definition of a root system guarantees that the roots themselves are integral elements. Thus, every integer linear combination of roots is also integral. In most cases, however, there will be integral elements that are not integer combinations of roots. That is to say, in general the weight lattice does not coincide with the root lattice.

== Classification of root systems by Dynkin diagrams ==
Pictures of all the connected Dynkin diagrams

A root system is irreducible if it cannot be partitioned into the union of two proper subsets $\Phi=\Phi_1\cup\Phi_2$, such that $(\alpha,\beta)=0$ for all $\alpha\in\Phi_1$ and $\beta\in\Phi_2$ .

Irreducible root systems correspond to certain graphs, the Dynkin diagrams named after Eugene Dynkin. The classification of these graphs is a simple matter of combinatorics, and induces a classification of irreducible root systems.

=== Constructing the Dynkin diagram ===
Given a root system, select a set Δ of simple roots as in the preceding section. The vertices of the associated Dynkin diagram correspond to the roots in Δ. Edges are drawn between vertices as follows, according to the angles. (Note that the angle between simple roots is always at least 90 degrees.)

- No edge if the vectors are orthogonal,
- An undirected single edge if they make an angle of 120 degrees,
- A directed double edge if they make an angle of 135 degrees, and
- A directed triple edge if they make an angle of 150 degrees.

The term "directed edge" means that double and triple edges are marked with an arrow pointing toward the shorter vector. (Thinking of the arrow as a "greater than" sign makes it clear which way the arrow is supposed to point.)

Note that by the elementary properties of roots noted above, the rules for creating the Dynkin diagram can also be described as follows. No edge if the roots are orthogonal; for nonorthogonal roots, a single, double, or triple edge according to whether the length ratio of the longer to shorter is 1, $\sqrt 2$, $\sqrt 3$. In the case of the $G_2$ root system for example, there are two simple roots at an angle of 150 degrees (with a length ratio of $\sqrt 3$). Thus, the Dynkin diagram has two vertices joined by a triple edge, with an arrow pointing from the vertex associated to the longer root to the other vertex. (In this case, the arrow is a bit redundant, since the diagram is equivalent whichever way the arrow goes.)

=== Classifying root systems ===
Although a given root system has more than one possible set of simple roots, the Weyl group acts transitively on such choices. Consequently, the Dynkin diagram is independent of the choice of simple roots; it is determined by the root system itself. Conversely, given two root systems with the same Dynkin diagram, one can match up roots, starting with the roots in the base, and show that the systems are in fact the same.

Thus the problem of classifying root systems reduces to the problem of classifying possible Dynkin diagrams. A root systems is irreducible if and only if its Dynkin diagram is connected. The possible connected diagrams are as indicated in the figure. The subscripts indicate the number of vertices in the diagram (and hence the rank of the corresponding irreducible root system).

If $\Phi$ is a root system, the Dynkin diagram for the dual root system $\Phi^\vee$ is obtained from the Dynkin diagram of $\Phi$ by keeping all the same vertices and edges, but reversing the directions of all arrows. Thus, we can see from their Dynkin diagrams that $B_n$ and $C_n$ are dual to each other.

== Weyl chambers and the Weyl group ==
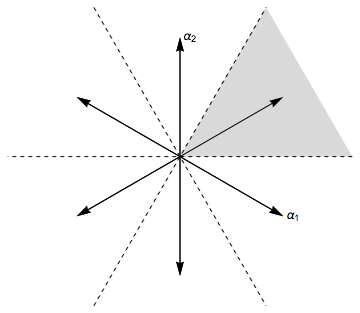
The shaded region is the fundamental Weyl chamber for the base $\{\alpha_1,\alpha_2\}$

If $\Phi\subset E$ is a root system, we may consider the hyperplane perpendicular to each root $\alpha$. Recall that $\sigma_\alpha$ denotes the reflection about the hyperplane and that the Weyl group is the group of transformations of $E$ generated by all the $\sigma_\alpha$'s. The complement of the set of hyperplanes is disconnected, and each connected component is called a Weyl chamber. If we have fixed a particular set Δ of simple roots, we may define the fundamental Weyl chamber associated to Δ as the set of points $v\in E$ such that $(\alpha,v)>0$ for all $\alpha\in\Delta$.

Since the reflections $\sigma_\alpha,\,\alpha\in\Phi$ preserve $\Phi$, they also preserve the set of hyperplanes perpendicular to the roots. Thus, each Weyl group element permutes the Weyl chambers.

The figure illustrates the case of the $A_2$ root system. The "hyperplanes" (in this case, one dimensional) orthogonal to the roots are indicated by dashed lines. The six 60-degree sectors are the Weyl chambers and the shaded region is the fundamental Weyl chamber associated to the indicated base.

A basic general theorem about Weyl chambers is this:

Theorem: The Weyl group acts freely and transitively on the Weyl chambers. Thus, the order of the Weyl group is equal to the number of Weyl chambers.

In the $A_2$ case, for example, the Weyl group has six elements and there are six Weyl chambers.

A related result is this one:

Theorem: Fix a Weyl chamber $C$. Then for all $v\in E$, the Weyl-orbit of $v$ contains exactly one point in the closure $\bar C$ of $C$.

== Root systems and Lie theory ==
Irreducible root systems classify a number of related objects in Lie theory, notably the following:

- simple complex Lie algebras (see the discussion above on root systems arising from semisimple Lie algebras),
- simply connected complex Lie groups which are simple modulo centers, and
- simply connected compact Lie groups which are simple modulo centers.

In each case, the roots are non-zero weights of the adjoint representation.

We now give a brief indication of how irreducible root systems classify simple Lie algebras over $\mathbb C$, following the arguments in Humphreys. A preliminary result says that a semisimple Lie algebra is simple if and only if the associated root system is irreducible. We thus restrict attention to irreducible root systems and simple Lie algebras.

- First, we must establish that for each simple algebra $\mathfrak g$ there is only one root system. This assertion follows from the result that the Cartan subalgebra of $\mathfrak g$ is unique up to automorphism, from which it follows that any two Cartan subalgebras give isomorphic root systems.
- Next, we need to show that for each irreducible root system, there can be at most one Lie algebra, that is, that the root system determines the Lie algebra up to isomorphism.
- Finally, we must show that for each irreducible root system, there is an associated simple Lie algebra. This claim is obvious for the root systems of type A, B, C, and D, for which the associated Lie algebras are the classical Lie algebras. It is then possible to analyze the exceptional algebras in a case-by-case fashion. Alternatively, one can develop a systematic procedure for building a Lie algebra from a root system, using Serre's relations.

For connections between the exceptional root systems and their Lie groups and Lie algebras see E_{8}, E_{7}, E_{6}, F_{4}, and G_{2}.

== Properties of the irreducible root systems ==
| Φ | |Φ| | |Φ^{<}| | I | D | |W| |
|---|---|---|---|---|---|
| A_{n} (n ≥ 1) | n(n + 1) | | | n + 1 | (n + 1)! |
| B_{n} (n ≥ 2) | 2n^{2} | 2n | 2 | 2 | 2^{n} n! |
| C_{n} (n ≥ 3) | 2n^{2} | 2n(n − 1) | 2^{n−1} | 2 | 2^{n} n! |
| D_{n} (n ≥ 4) | 2n(n − 1) | | | 4 | 2^{n−1} n! |
| E_{6} | 72 | | | 3 | 51840 |
| E_{7} | 126 | | | 2 | 2903040 |
| E_{8} | 240 | | | 1 | 696729600 |
| F_{4} | 48 | 24 | 4 | 1 | 1152 |
| G_{2} | 12 | 6 | 3 | 1 | 12 |

Irreducible root systems are named according to their corresponding connected Dynkin diagrams. There are four infinite families (A_{n}, B_{n}, C_{n}, and D_{n}, called the classical root systems) and five exceptional cases (the exceptional root systems). The subscript indicates the rank of the root system.

In an irreducible root system there can be at most two values for the length (α, α)^{1/2}, corresponding to short and long roots. If all roots have the same length they are taken to be long by definition and the root system is said to be simply laced; this occurs in the cases A, D and E. Any two roots of the same length lie in the same orbit of the Weyl group. In the non-simply laced cases B, C, G and F, the root lattice is spanned by the short roots and the long roots span a sublattice, invariant under the Weyl group, equal to r^{2}/2 times the coroot lattice, where r is the length of a long root.

In the adjacent table, |Φ^{<}| denotes the number of short roots, I denotes the index in the root lattice of the sublattice generated by long roots, D denotes the determinant of the Cartan matrix, and |W| denotes the order of the Weyl group.

== Explicit construction of the irreducible root systems ==
=== A_{n} ===
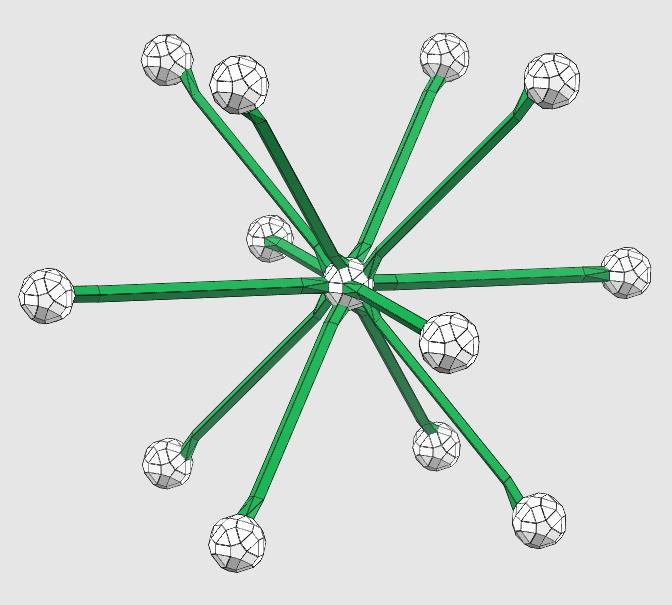
Model of the $A_3$ root system in the Zometool system

Simple roots in A_{3}
| | e_{1} | e_{2} | e_{3} | e_{4} |
|---|---|---|---|---|
| α_{1} | 1 | −1 | 0 | 0 |
| α_{2} | 0 | 1 | −1 | 0 |
| α_{3} | 0 | 0 | 1 | −1 |

Let E be the subspace of R^{n+1} for which the coordinates sum to 0, and let Φ be the set of vectors in E of length √2 and which are integer vectors, i.e. have integer coordinates in R^{n+1}. Such a vector must have all but two coordinates equal to 0, one coordinate equal to 1, and one equal to −1, so there are n^{2} + n roots in all. One choice of simple roots expressed in the standard basis is α_{i} = e_{i} − e_{i+1} for 1 ≤ i ≤ n.

The reflection σ_{i} through the hyperplane perpendicular to α_{i} is the same as permutation of the adjacent ith and (i + 1)th coordinates. Such transpositions generate the full permutation group. For adjacent simple roots, σ_{i}(α_{i+1}) = α_{i+1} + α_{i} = σ_{i+1}(α_{i}) = α_{i} + α_{i+1}, that is, reflection is equivalent to adding a multiple of 1; but reflection of a simple root perpendicular to a nonadjacent simple root leaves it unchanged, differing by a multiple of 0.

The A_{n} root lattice – that is, the lattice generated by the A_{n} roots – is most easily described as the set of integer vectors in R^{n+1} whose components sum to zero.

The A_{2} root lattice is the vertex arrangement of the triangular tiling.

The A_{3} root lattice is known to crystallographers as the face-centered cubic (or cubic close packed) lattice. It is the vertex arrangement of the tetrahedral-octahedral honeycomb.

The A_{3} root system (as well as the other rank-three root systems) may be modeled in the Zometool construction set.

In general, the A_{n} root lattice is the vertex arrangement of the n-dimensional simplicial honeycomb.

=== B_{n} ===
Simple roots in B_{4}
| | e_{1} | e_{2} | e_{3} | e_{4} |
|---|---|---|---|---|
| α_{1} | 1 | −1 | 0 | 0 |
| α_{2} | 0 | 1 | −1 | 0 |
| α_{3} | 0 | 0 | 1 | −1 |
| α_{4} | 0 | 0 | 0 | 1 |

Let E = R^{n}, and let Φ consist of all integer vectors in E of length 1 or √2. The total number of roots is 2n^{2}. One choice of simple roots is α_{i} = e_{i} – e_{i+1} for 1 ≤ i ≤ n – 1 (the above choice of simple roots for A_{n−1}), and the shorter root α_{n} = e_{n}.

The reflection σ_{n} through the hyperplane perpendicular to the short root α_{n} is of course simply negation of the nth coordinate. For the long simple root α_{n−1}, σ_{n−1}(α_{n}) = α_{n} + α_{n−1}, but for reflection perpendicular to the short root, σ_{n}(α_{n−1}) = α_{n−1} + 2α_{n}, a difference by a multiple of 2 instead of 1.

The B_{n} root lattice—that is, the lattice generated by the B_{n} roots—consists of all integer vectors.

B_{1} is isomorphic to A_{1} via scaling by √2, and is therefore not a distinct root system.

=== C_{n} ===
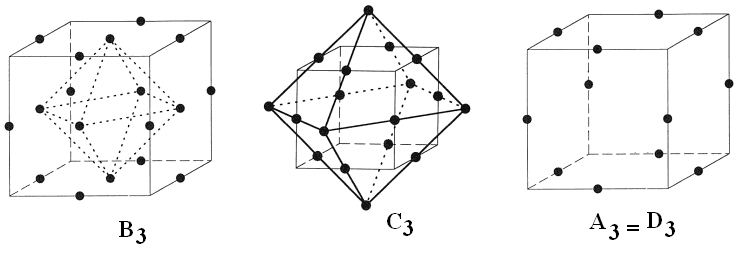
Root system B_{3}, C_{3}, and A_{3} = D_{3} as points within a cube and octahedron

Simple roots in C_{4}
| | e_{1} | e_{2} | e_{3} | e_{4} |
|---|---|---|---|---|
| α_{1} | 1 | −1 | 0 | 0 |
| α_{2} | 0 | 1 | −1 | 0 |
| α_{3} | 0 | 0 | 1 | −1 |
| α_{4} | 0 | 0 | 0 | 2 |

Let E = R^{n}, and let Φ consist of all integer vectors in E of length √2 together with all vectors of the form 2λ, where λ is an integer vector of length 1. The total number of roots is 2n^{2}. One choice of simple roots is: α_{i} = e_{i} − e_{i+1}, for 1 ≤ i ≤ n − 1 (the above choice of simple roots for A_{n−1}), and the longer root α_{n} = 2e_{n}. The reflection σ_{n}(α_{n−1}) = α_{n−1} + α_{n}, but σ_{n−1}(α_{n}) = α_{n} + 2α_{n−1}.

The C_{n} root lattice—that is, the lattice generated by the C_{n} roots—consists of all integer vectors whose components sum to an even integer.

C_{2} is isomorphic to B_{2} via scaling by √2 and a 45 degree rotation, and is therefore not a distinct root system.

=== D_{n} ===
Simple roots in D_{4}
| | e_{1} | e_{2} | e_{3} | e_{4} |
|---|---|---|---|---|
| α_{1} | 1 | −1 | 0 | 0 |
| α_{2} | 0 | 1 | −1 | 0 |
| α_{3} | 0 | 0 | 1 | −1 |
| α_{4} | 0 | 0 | 1 | 1 |

Let E = R^{n}, and let Φ consist of all integer vectors in E of length √2. The total number of roots is 2n(n − 1). One choice of simple roots is α_{i} = e_{i} − e_{i+1} for 1 ≤ i ≤ n − 1 (the above choice of simple roots for A_{n−1}) together with α_{n} = e_{n−1} + e_{n}.

Reflection through the hyperplane perpendicular to α_{n} is the same as transposing and negating the adjacent n-th and (n − 1)-th coordinates. Any simple root and its reflection perpendicular to another simple root differ by a multiple of 0 or 1 of the second root, not by any greater multiple.

The D_{n} root lattice – that is, the lattice generated by the D_{n} roots – consists of all integer vectors whose components sum to an even integer. This is the same as the C_{n} root lattice.

The D_{n} roots are expressed as the vertices of a rectified n-orthoplex, Coxeter–Dynkin diagram:.... The 2n(n − 1) vertices exist in the middle of the edges of the n-orthoplex.

D_{3} coincides with A_{3}, and is therefore not a distinct root system. The twelve D_{3} root vectors are expressed as the vertices of, a lower symmetry construction of the cuboctahedron.

D_{4} has additional symmetry called triality. The twenty-four D_{4} root vectors are expressed as the vertices of, a lower symmetry construction of the 24-cell.

=== E_{6}, E_{7}, E_{8} ===
| 72 vertices of 1_{22} represent the root vectors of E_{6} (Green nodes are doubled in this E6 Coxeter plane projection) | 126 vertices of 2_{31} represent the root vectors of E_{7} | 240 vertices of 4_{21} represent the root vectors of E_{8} |

- The E_{8} root system is any set of vectors in R^{8} that is congruent to the following set:
  $$D_8 \cup \left\{ \frac 1 2 \left( \sum_{i=1}^8 \varepsilon_i \mathbf e_i \right) : \varepsilon_i = \pm1, \, \varepsilon_1 \cdots \varepsilon_8 = +1 \right\}.$$

The root system has 240 roots. The set just listed is the set of vectors of length √2 in the E8 root lattice, also known simply as the E8 lattice or Γ_{8}. This is the set of points in R^{8} such that:

1. all the coordinates are integers or all the coordinates are half-integers (a mixture of integers and half-integers is not allowed), and
2. the sum of the eight coordinates is an even integer.

Thus,
$$E_8 = \left\{ \alpha\in\mathbb Z^8 \cup \left(\mathbb Z + \tfrac 1 2\right)^8 : |\alpha|^2 = \sum\alpha_i^2  = 2,\, \sum\alpha_i \in 2\mathbb Z. \right\}$$

- The root system E_{7} is the set of vectors in E_{8} that are perpendicular to a fixed root in E_{8}. The root system E_{7} has 126 roots.
- The root system E_{6} is not the set of vectors in E_{7} that are perpendicular to a fixed root in E_{7}, indeed, one obtains D_{6} that way. However, E_{6} is the subsystem of E_{8} perpendicular to two suitably chosen roots of E_{8}. The root system E_{6} has 72 roots.

Simple roots in E_{8}: even coordinates
| 1 | −1 | 0 | 0 | 0 | 0 | 0 | 0 |
| 0 | 1 | −1 | 0 | 0 | 0 | 0 | 0 |
| 0 | 0 | 1 | −1 | 0 | 0 | 0 | 0 |
| 0 | 0 | 0 | 1 | −1 | 0 | 0 | 0 |
| 0 | 0 | 0 | 0 | 1 | −1 | 0 | 0 |
| 0 | 0 | 0 | 0 | 0 | 1 | −1 | 0 |
| 0 | 0 | 0 | 0 | 0 | 1 | 1 | 0 |
| −1/2 | −1/2 | −1/2 | −1/2 | −1/2 | −1/2 | −1/2 | −1/2 |

An alternative description of the E_{8} lattice which is sometimes convenient is as the set Γ'_{8} of all points in R^{8} such that

- all the coordinates are integers and the sum of the coordinates is even, or
- all the coordinates are half-integers and the sum of the coordinates is odd.

The lattices Γ_{8} and Γ'_{8} are isomorphic; one may pass from one to the other by changing the signs of any odd number of coordinates. The lattice Γ_{8} is sometimes called the even coordinate system for E_{8} while the lattice Γ'_{8} is called the odd coordinate system.

One choice of simple roots for E_{8} in the even coordinate system with rows ordered by node order in the alternate (non-canonical) Dynkin diagrams (above) is:

α_{i} = e_{i} − e_{i+1}, for 1 ≤ i ≤ 6, and
α_{7} = e_{7} + e_{6}

(the above choice of simple roots for D_{7}) along with
$$\boldsymbol\alpha_8 = \boldsymbol\beta_0 = -\frac{1}{2} \sum_{i=1}^8\mathbf{e}_i = (-1/2,-1/2,-1/2,-1/2,-1/2,-1/2,-1/2,-1/2).$$

Simple roots in E_{8}: odd coordinates
| 1 | −1 | 0 | 0 | 0 | 0 | 0 | 0 |
| 0 | 1 | −1 | 0 | 0 | 0 | 0 | 0 |
| 0 | 0 | 1 | −1 | 0 | 0 | 0 | 0 |
| 0 | 0 | 0 | 1 | −1 | 0 | 0 | 0 |
| 0 | 0 | 0 | 0 | 1 | −1 | 0 | 0 |
| 0 | 0 | 0 | 0 | 0 | 1 | −1 | 0 |
| 0 | 0 | 0 | 0 | 0 | 0 | 1 | −1 |
| −1/2 | −1/2 | −1/2 | −1/2 | −1/2 | 1/2 | 1/2 | 1/2 |

One choice of simple roots for E_{8} in the odd coordinate system with rows ordered by node order in alternate (non-canonical) Dynkin diagrams (above) is

α_{i} = e_{i} − e_{i+1}, for 1 ≤ i ≤ 7

(the above choice of simple roots for A_{7}) along with

α_{8} = β_{5}, where
$$\boldsymbol\beta_j = \frac{1}{2} \left(- \sum_{i=1}^j e_i + \sum_{i=j+1}^8 e_i\right).$$

(Using β_{3} would give an isomorphic result. Using β_{1,7} or β_{2,6} would simply give A_{8} or D_{8}. As for β_{4}, its coordinates sum to 0, and the same is true for α_{1...7}, so they span only the 7-dimensional subspace for which the coordinates sum to 0; in fact −2β_{4} has coordinates (1,2,3,4,3,2,1) in the basis (α_{i}).)

Since perpendicularity to α_{1} means that the first two coordinates are equal, E_{7} is then the subset of E_{8} where the first two coordinates are equal, and similarly E_{6} is the subset of E_{8} where the first three coordinates are equal. This facilitates explicit definitions of E_{7} and E_{6} as

E_{7} = {α ∈ Z^{7} ∪ (Z+1/2)^{7} : Σα_{i}^{2} + α_{1}^{2} = 2, Σα_{i} + α_{1} ∈ 2Z},
E_{6} = {α ∈ Z^{6} ∪ (Z+1/2)^{6} : Σα_{i}^{2} + 2α_{1}^{2} = 2, Σα_{i} + 2α_{1} ∈ 2Z}

Note that deleting α_{1} and then α_{2} gives sets of simple roots for E_{7} and E_{6}. However, these sets of simple roots are in different E_{7} and E_{6} subspaces of E_{8} than the ones written above, since they are not orthogonal to α_{1} or α_{2}.

=== F_{4} ===
Simple roots in F_{4}
| | e_{1} | e_{2} | e_{3} | e_{4} |
|---|---|---|---|---|
| α_{1} | 1 | −1 | 0 | 0 |
| α_{2} | 0 | 1 | −1 | 0 |
| α_{3} | 0 | 0 | 1 | 0 |
| α_{4} | −1/2 | −1/2 | −1/2 | −1/2 |

48-root vectors of F4, defined by vertices of the 24-cell and its dual, viewed in the Coxeter plane

For F_{4}, let E = R^{4}, and let Φ denote the set of vectors α of length 1 or √2 such that the coordinates of 2α are all integers and are either all even or all odd. There are 48 roots in this system. One choice of simple roots is: the choice of simple roots given above for B_{3}, plus $\boldsymbol\alpha_4 = -\frac{1}{2} \sum_{i=1}^4 e_i$.

The F_{4} root lattice—that is, the lattice generated by the F_{4} root system—is the set of points in R^{4} such that either all the coordinates are integers or all the coordinates are half-integers (a mixture of integers and half-integers is not allowed). This lattice is isomorphic to the lattice of Hurwitz quaternions.

=== G_{2} ===
Simple roots in G_{2}
| | e_{1} | e_{2} | e_{3} |
|---|---|---|---|
| α_{1} | 1 | −1 | 0 |
| β | −1 | 2 | −1 |

The root system G_{2} has 12 roots, which form the vertices of a hexagram. See the picture above.

One choice of simple roots is (α_{1}, β = α_{2} − α_{1}) where α_{i} = e_{i} − e_{i+1} for i = 1, 2 is the above choice of simple roots for A_{2}.

The G_{2} root lattice—that is, the lattice generated by the G_{2} roots—is the same as the A_{2} root lattice.

== The root poset ==
Hasse diagram of E6 root poset with edge labels identifying the added simple root

The set of positive roots is naturally ordered by saying that $\alpha \leq \beta$ if and only if $\beta-\alpha$ is a nonnegative linear combination of simple roots. This poset is graded by $\deg\left(\sum_{\alpha \in \Delta} \lambda_\alpha \alpha\right) = \sum_{\alpha \in \Delta}\lambda_\alpha$, and has many remarkable combinatorial properties, one of them being that one can determine the degrees of the fundamental invariants of the corresponding Weyl group from this poset. The Hasse graph is a visualization of the ordering of the root poset.

== See also ==
- ADE classification
- Affine root system
- Coxeter–Dynkin diagram
- Coxeter group
- Coxeter matrix
- Dynkin diagram
- Root datum
- Root system of a semi-simple Lie algebra
- Semisimple Lie algebra
- Weights in the representation theory of semisimple Lie algebras
- Weyl group
