= Science and technology in Ukraine =

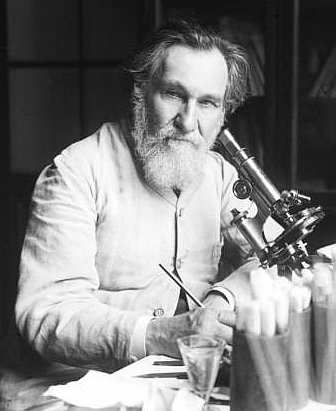
Ilya Mechnikov (1845—1916), a laureate of the Nobel Prize, graduate of Kharkiv University and professor of zoology in Odessa University

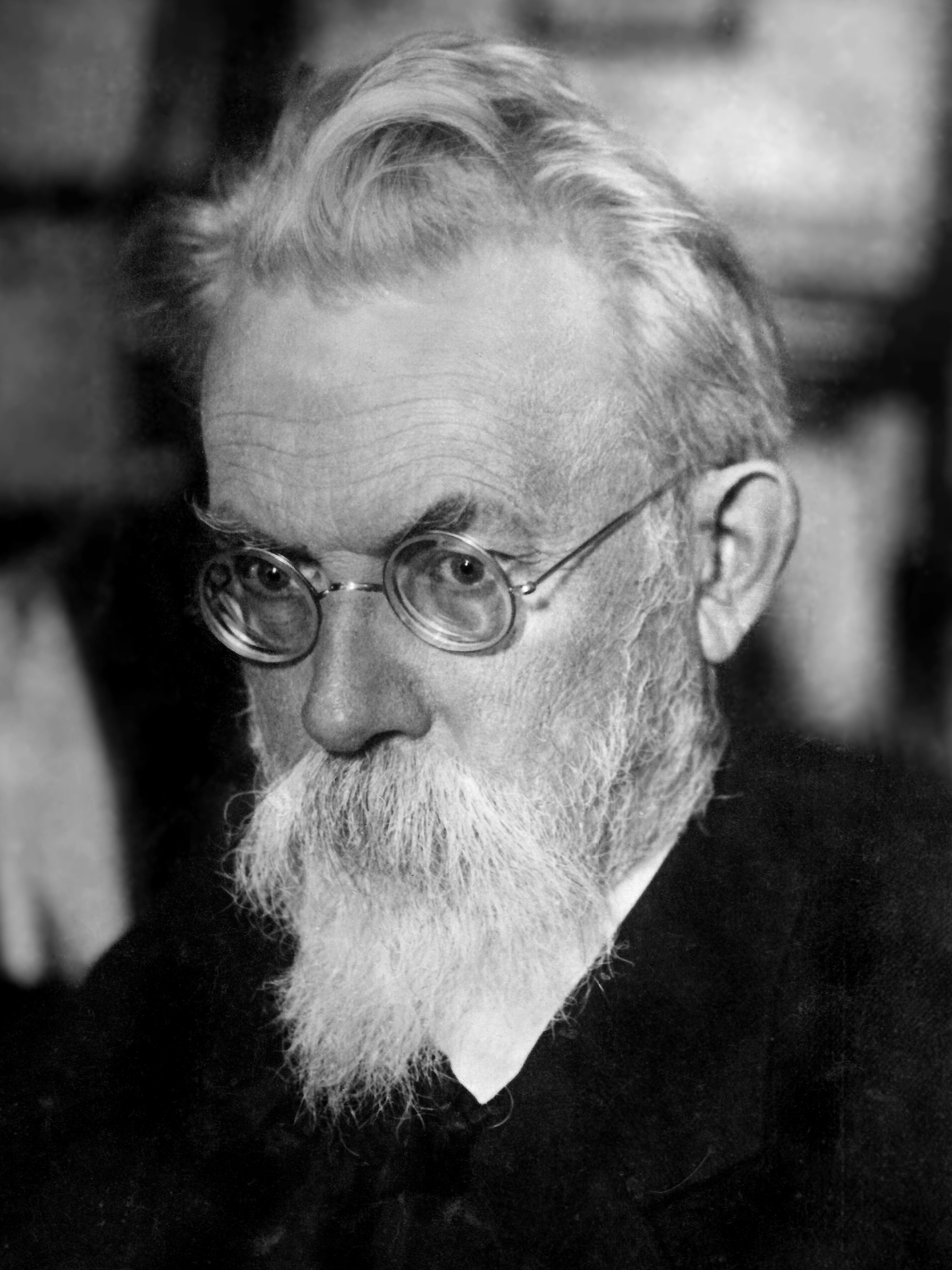
Vladimir Vernadsky, the founder of the Ukrainian Academy of Sciences (now National Academy of Sciences of Ukraine).

Science and technology in Ukraine has its modern development and historical origins in the 18th and 19th centuries and is associated, first of all, with the Kyiv Mohyla Academy, University of Kyiv and University of Kharkiv. The founding of Ukraine's main research institution, the National Academy of Sciences of Ukraine, in 1918 by Volodymyr Vernadsky marked an important milestone in the country's subsequent scientific and technological development.

Ukraine's space science advanced rapidly in the aftermath of World War II, with Korolyov and Chelomey leading the rocket and spaceflight development in the Soviet Union during the Space Race.

The Kharkiv Institute of Physics and Technology was the site of the world's first torsatron-type stellarator, Saturn-1. Today it is the site of the larger Uragan-2M torsatron experiment, which was the largest stellarator in Europe until the commissioning of Wendelstein 7-X in 2015.

Ukraine was ranked 66th in the Global Innovation Index in 2025, down from 57th in 2023, and 49th in 2021.

== Notable people ==
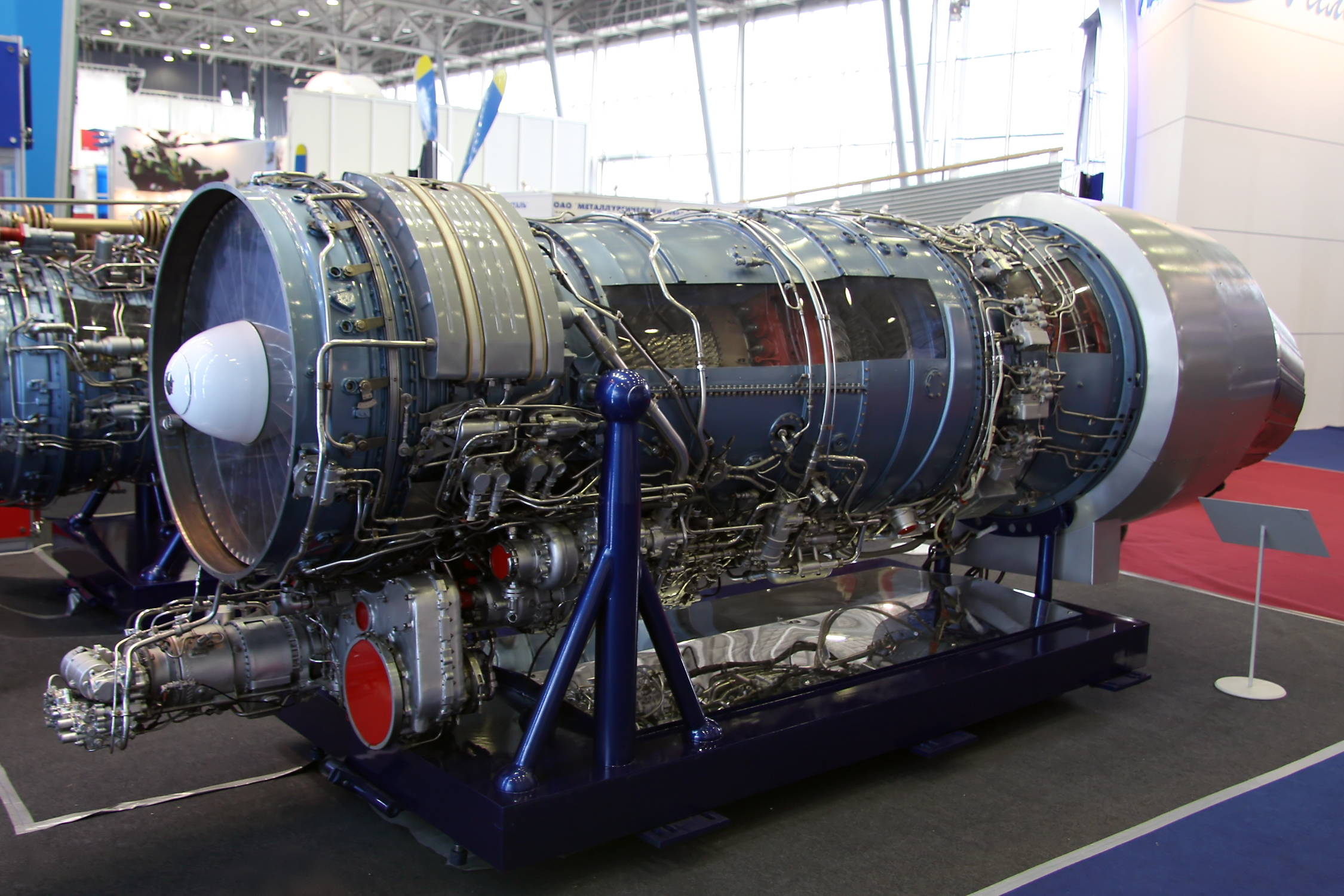
The Saturn AL-31 is a family of military turbofan engines, developed by the Lyulka in the Soviet Union

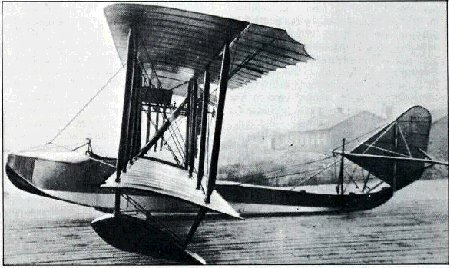
Grigorovich M-5 was a successful World War I-era two-bay unequal-span biplane flying boat with a single step hull, designed by Ukrainian and Soviet aircraft designer Dmitry Pavlovich Grigorovich

- Mikhail Ostrogradsky (1801—1862), mathematician known for the Divergence theorem and Ostrogradsky instability, among other results.
- Mykhaylo Maksymovych (1804—1873), botanist, historian, linguist, ethnographer, first rector of Kyiv University.
- Vladimir Betz (1834—1894), anatomist, histologist. See Betz cell.
- Ilya Mechnikov (1845—1916), zoologist, awarded the 1908 Nobel Prize in Physiology or Medicine "in recognition of their work on immunity".
- Ivan Puluj (1845—1918), physicist, inventor. Early developer of the use of X-rays for medical imaging.
- Ivan Horbachevsky (1854—1942), chemist. See Xanthine oxidase.
- Volodymyr Vernadsky (1863—1945), mineralogist and geochemist, founder and first chairman of the Ukrainian Academy of Sciences.
- Georgy Voronoy (1868—1908), mathematician. See Voronoi diagram.
- Stephen Timoshenko (1878—1972), engineer. See Timoshenko beam theory.
- Ivan Schmalhausen (1884—1963), evolutionary biologist, zoologist, one of the central figures in the development of the modern evolutionary synthesis.
- Igor Sikorsky (1889—1972), aviation pioneer.
- Mikhail Kravchuk (also Krawtchouk) (1892—1942), mathematician. See Kravchuk polynomials, Kravchuk matrix.
- Valery Glivenko (1896—1940), mathematician. See Glivenko–Cantelli theorem, Glivenko's theorem, Glivenko–Stone theorem.
- Yuri Kondratyuk (1897—1942), mathematician, engineer. Developed the first known Lunar Orbit Rendezvous.
- Theodosius Dobzhansky (1900—1975), geneticist, evolutionary biologist. See Bateson–Dobzhansky–Muller model.
- George Kistiakowsky (1900—1982), physical chemistry professor at Harvard who participated in the Manhattan Project and later served as President Dwight D. Eisenhower's Science Advisor.
- Olexander Smakula (1900—1983), physicist. Inventor of anti-reflective lens coatings based on optical interference.
- Aleksandr Markevich (1905—1999), zoologist, parasitologist, founder of the Ukrainian schools of parasitology and invertebrate zoology.
- Oleg Antonov (1906—1984), aircraft designer, and the first chief of the Antonov - a world-famous aircraft company in Ukraine.
- Sergei Korolyov (1907—1966), rocket scientist, chief designer of the Soviet space program. See Voskhod, Vostok, Soyuz.
- Valentin Glushko (1908—1989), rocket scientist. See RD-214, RD-270, NPO Energomash.
- Arkhip Lyulka (1908—1984), jet engine engineer. See Lyulka AL-21, Saturn AL-31, NPO Saturn.
- Nikolay Bogolyubov (1909—1992), mathematician and theoretical physicist known for a significant contribution to quantum field theory, classical and quantum statistical mechanics, and the theory of dynamical systems.
- Gleb Lozino-Lozinskiy (1909—2001), engineer, lead developer of the Buran spacecraft programme.
- Nikolai Amosov (1913—2002), doctor, heart surgeon, inventor.
- Olexiy Ivakhnenko (1913—2007), computer scientist, mathematician. See Group method of data handling.
- Vladimir Chelomey (1914—1984), rocket scientist. See Proton rocket.
- Borys Paton (1918), mechanician, long-term chairman of the National Academy of Sciences of Ukraine.
- Vladimir Marchenko (1922–2026), mathematician. See Marchenko–Pastur distribution.
- Victor Glushkov (1923—1982), founder of information technology in the Soviet Union, and one of the founders of cybernetics.
- Platon Kostiuk (1924—2010), physiologist, neurobiologist, electrophysiologist, and biophysicist.
- Anatoliy Skorokhod (1930—2011), mathematician. See Skorokhod integral, Skorokhod space, Skorokhod's embedding theorem.
- Oleksandr Sharkovsky (1936), mathematician. See Sharkovskii's theorem.
- Leonid Pastur (1937), mathematician. See Marchenko–Pastur distribution.
- Leonid Levin (1948), computer scientist, mathematician. See Cook–Levin theorem (NP-completeness of the boolean satisfiability problem).
- Rostislav Grigorchuk (1953), mathematician. See Grigorchuk group.
- Vladimir Drinfeld (1954), mathematician. Awarded the Fields Medal in 1990. See Quantum group, Drinfeld-Sokolov-Wilson equation.
- Yury Gogotsi (1961), chemist.
- Maryna Viazovska (1984), mathematician, solved the sphere-packing problem in dimension 8, and, in collaboration with others, in dimension 24.
- Maurice Goldhaber(1911-2011), physicist, determined the helicity of neutrinos.

== History and organization ==
=== Reforms to the legal framework for science and technology, 2015–2019 ===
Since 2015, the government has reformed the management of the national innovation system. The State Agency for Science, Innovation and Information has been abolished, with the transfer of all functions related to policy formulation to the Ministry of Education and Science, although a number of other ministries and agencies also allocate state money to specific activities.

Ukraine's legal framework was substantially modified in late 2015 with the adoption of new laws reinforcing institutional support for the national innovation system. The Law on Scientific and Technical Activities (2015) places the National Council for Science and Technology Development under the control of the Cabinet of Ministers. The council is tasked with ensuring the effective co-operation of representatives from the scientific community, state agencies and the business sector in the preparation and implementation of related state policy.

In addition, the National Fund for Research (2015) has replaced the State Fund for Basic Research, which was subordinate to the Ministry of Education and Science. The new fund's key function is to provide competitive grants for basic and applied research. The fund is also mandated to support experimental development and innovation in priority areas.

The new legal framework is expected to play an important role in transforming Ukraine's public academies of science, especially the National Academy of Sciences. It has paved the way to involving ordinary scientists in the election of academies' governing bodies; it has also placed constraints on academies' membership and top positions. Additionally, public research institutions now have the legal right to co-found commercial companies and to take part in the formation of their share capital.

A number of other key legislative acts relating to science, innovation and science parks were under revision in 2020. However, the effective implementation of legislative acts remains the Achilles' heel of Ukraine's science and innovation policy.

==== High-tech office ====
One outcome of reform will be the creation of a special High-Tech Office within the government to stimulate high-tech industries, especially in the expanding ICT sector. In 2020, business associations, along with government experts, were preparing the legal groundwork for the establishment of this office. The growth of Ukraine's ICT sector is reflected in the depth of its exports of related services, which now account for more than 40% of total exports. Ukraine's success in this area is tied to its relatively large pool of specialists.

Ukraine has been implementing key elements of its e-governance strategy since 2015. One outcome is ProZorro, an electronic system for public procurement, established in 2016–2018. Early signs indicate that ProZorro has helped to reduce corruption in the attribution of government contracts.

=== Russo-Ukrainian War ===
The Russo-Ukrainian war substantially impacts Ukrainian science. Several groups of academics have created one action plan outlining how the global science community could help Ukraine, including helping organizing (re)vitalization of Ukrainian science and reconstruction in the future. Science and technology were also used to defend against the 2022 Russian invasion such as with military technology, to document and communicate war events including war crimes, to provide and receive aid via telehealth, and for aggregated information about support opportunities for Ukrainian scientists.

A dramatic increase in defence development took place after the 2022 invasion, with Ukraine creating the Brave1 platform in April 2023 to promote development of innovative systems by bringing together scientists and technicians with financiers and the military to rapidly turn ideas into workable weapons such as military drones.
