= Factorization algebra =

Algebraic structure in mathematical physics

In mathematics and mathematical physics, a factorization algebra is an algebraic structure first introduced by Beilinson and Drinfel'd in an algebro-geometric setting as a reformulation of chiral algebras and applied in a more general setting by Costello and Gwilliam to formalize quantum field theory.

== Definition ==
=== Prefactorization algebras ===
A factorization algebra is a prefactorization algebra satisfying some properties, similar to sheaves being a presheaf with extra conditions.

If $M$ is a topological space, a prefactorization algebra $\mathcal{F}$ of vector spaces on $M$ is an assignment of vector spaces $\mathcal{F}(U)$ to open sets $U$ of $M$, along with the following conditions on the assignment:

- For each inclusion $U \subset V$, there's a linear map $m_V^U: \mathcal{F}(U) \rightarrow \mathcal{F}(V)$
- There is a linear map $m_V^{U_1, \cdots, U_n}: \mathcal{F}(U_1)\otimes \cdots \otimes \mathcal{F}(U_n) \rightarrow \mathcal{F}(V)$ for each finite collection of open sets with each $U_i \subset V$ and the $U_i$ pairwise disjoint.
- The maps compose in the obvious way: for collections of opens $U_{i, j}$, $V_i$ and an open $W$ satisfying $U_{i,1}\sqcup \cdots \sqcup U_{i, n_i} \subset V_i$ and $V_1 \sqcup \cdots \sqcup V_n \subset W$, the following diagram commutes.

$\begin{array}{lcl} & \bigotimes_i \bigotimes_j \mathcal{F}(U_{i,j}) & \rightarrow & \bigotimes_i \mathcal{F}(V_i) & \\ & \downarrow & \swarrow & \\ & \mathcal{F}(W) & & & \\ \end{array}$

So $\mathcal{F}$ resembles a precosheaf, except the vector spaces are tensored rather than (direct-)summed.

The category of vector spaces can be replaced with any symmetric monoidal category.

=== Factorization algebras ===
To define factorization algebras, it is necessary to define a Weiss cover. For $U$ an open set, a collection of opens $\mathfrak{U} = \{U_i | i \in I\}$ is a Weiss cover of $U$ if for any finite collection of points $\{x_1, \cdots, x_k\}$ in $U$, there is an open set $U_i \in \mathfrak{U}$ such that $\{x_1, \cdots, x_k\} \subset U_i$.

Then a factorization algebra of vector spaces on $M$ is a prefactorization algebra of vector spaces on $M$ so that for every open $U$ and every Weiss cover $\{U_i | i \in I\}$ of $U$, the sequence
$$\bigoplus_{i,j} \mathcal{F}(U_i \cap U_j) \rightarrow \bigoplus_k \mathcal{F}(U_k) \rightarrow \mathcal{F}(U) \rightarrow 0$$
is exact. That is, $\mathcal{F}$ is a factorization algebra if it is a cosheaf with respect to the Weiss topology.

A factorization algebra is multiplicative if, in addition, for each pair of disjoint opens $U, V \subset M$, the structure map
$$m^{U, V}_{U\sqcup V} : \mathcal{F}(U)\otimes \mathcal{F}(V) \rightarrow \mathcal{F}(U \sqcup V)$$
is an isomorphism.

=== Algebro-geometric formulation ===
While this formulation is related to the one given above, the relation is not immediate.

Let $X$ be a smooth complex curve. A factorization algebra on $X$ consists of

- A quasicoherent sheaf $\mathcal{V}_{X, I}$ over $X^{I}$ for any finite set $I$, with no non-zero local section supported at the union of all partial diagonals
- Functorial isomorphisms of quasicoherent sheaves $\Delta^*_{J/I}\mathcal{V}_{X, J} \rightarrow \mathcal{V}_{X, I}$ over $X^I$ for surjections $J \rightarrow I$.
- (Factorization) Functorial isomorphisms of quasicoherent sheaves

$$j^*_{J/I}\mathcal{V}_{X, J} \rightarrow j^*_{J/I}(\boxtimes_{i \in I} \mathcal{V}_{X, p^{-1}(i)})$$
over $U^{J/I}$.

- (Unit) Let $\mathcal{V} = \mathcal{V}_{X, \{1\}}$ and $\mathcal{V}_2 = \mathcal{V}_{X, \{1, 2\}}$. A global section (the unit) $1 \in \mathcal{V}(X)$ with the property that for every local section $f \in \mathcal V(U)$ ($U \subset X$), the section $1 \boxtimes f$ of $\mathcal{V}_2|_{U^2\Delta}$ extends across the diagonal, and restricts to $f \in \mathcal{V} \cong \mathcal{V}_2|_\Delta$.

== Example ==
=== Associative algebra ===
Any associative algebra $A$ can be realized as a prefactorization algebra $A^{f}$ on $\mathbb{R}$. To each open interval $(a,b)$, assign $A^f((a,b)) = A$. An arbitrary open is a disjoint union of countably many open intervals, $U = \bigsqcup_i I_i$, and then set $A^f(U) = \bigotimes_i A$. The structure maps simply come from the multiplication map on $A$. Some care is needed for infinite tensor products, but for finitely many open intervals the picture is straightforward.

== See also ==
- Algebraic quantum field theory
- Vertex algebra
