= Lorenzo Ramero =

Italian mathematician

- Born: Cuneo, Italy
- Education: University of Pisa; Scuola Normale Superiore di Pisa; Massachusetts Institute of Technology
- Known for: Almost ring theory
- Scientific career
- Workplaces: University of Lille
- Doctoral advisor: Alexander Beilinson

Lorenzo Ramero is an Italian mathematician living in France, specialized in algebraic and arithmetic geometry. He is currently a professor of mathematics at the University of Lille.

Ramero obtained his Laurea in Matematica from the University of Pisa and his Diploma from the Scuola Normale Superiore di Pisa in 1989. He completed his Ph.D. at the Massachusetts Institute of Technology in 1994 under the supervision of Alexander Beilinson, with a thesis titled An $\ell$-adic Fourier transform over local fields.

Together with Ofer Gabber, Ramero developed the algebraic geometry based on almost rings extending earlier ideas of Gerd Faltings on "almost mathematics". This theory extends already classical algebraic geometry formalism of Alexander Grothendieck's school in order to treat new phenomena in p-adic Hodge theory. This work is systematized in their monograph Almost ring theory.

More foundational material was developed after the first book, and especially an extended theory of perfectoid rings and perfectoid spaces which generalizes the recent work of Peter Scholze. These aspects were recapitulated in the book "Foundations for Almost Ring Theory".

Ramero has authored a textbook on commutative algebra, Grimoire d'Algèbre Commutative (in French), emphasizing the numerous connections and interactions between commutative algebra and other areas and branches of mathematics.
