= Perfectoid space =

Used to compare mixed characteristic situations with purely finite characteristic ones

In mathematics, perfectoid spaces are adic spaces of special kind, which occur in the study of problems of "mixed characteristic", such as local fields of characteristic zero which have residue fields of characteristic prime p.

A perfectoid field is a complete topological field K whose topology is induced by a nondiscrete valuation of rank 1, such that the Frobenius endomorphism Φ is surjective on K°/p where K° denotes the ring of power-bounded elements.

Perfectoid spaces may be used to (and were invented in order to) compare mixed characteristic situations with purely finite characteristic ones. Technical tools for making this precise are the tilting equivalence and the almost purity theorem. The notions were introduced in 2012 by Peter Scholze.

== Tilting equivalence ==
For any perfectoid field K there is a tilt K^{♭}, which is a perfectoid field of finite characteristic p. As a set, it may be defined as

$$K^\flat = \varprojlim_{x \mapsto x^p} K.$$

Explicitly, an element of K^{♭} is an infinite sequence (x_{0}, x_{1}, x_{2}, ...) of elements of K such that x_{i} = x^{p}_{i+1}. The multiplication in K^{♭} is defined termwise, while the addition is more complicated. If K has finite characteristic, then K ≅ K^{♭}. If K is the p-adic completion of $\mathbb{Q}_p(p^{1/p^\infty})$, then K^{♭} is the t-adic completion of $\mathbb{F}_p((t))(t^{1/p^\infty})$.

There are notions of perfectoid algebras and perfectoid spaces over a perfectoid field K, roughly analogous to commutative algebras and schemes over a field. The tilting operation extends to these objects. If X is a perfectoid space over a perfectoid field K, then one may form a perfectoid space X^{♭} over K^{♭}. The tilting equivalence is a theorem that the tilting functor (-)^{♭} induces an equivalence of categories between perfectoid spaces over K and perfectoid spaces over K^{♭}. Note that while a perfectoid field of finite characteristic may have several non-isomorphic "untilts", the categories of perfectoid spaces over them would all be equivalent.

=== Almost purity theorem ===
This equivalence of categories respects some additional properties of morphisms. Many properties of morphisms of schemes have analogues for morphisms of adic spaces. The almost purity theorem for perfectoid spaces is concerned with finite étale morphisms. It's a generalization of Faltings's almost purity theorem in p-adic Hodge theory. The name is alluding to almost mathematics, which is used in a proof, and a distantly related classical theorem on purity of the branch locus.

The statement has two parts. Let K be a perfectoid field.

- If X → Y is a finite étale morphism of adic spaces over K and Y is perfectoid, then X also is perfectoid;
- A morphism X → Y of perfectoid spaces over K is finite étale if and only if the tilt X^{♭} → Y^{♭} is finite étale over K^{♭}.

Since finite étale maps into a field are exactly finite separable field extensions, the almost purity theorem implies that for any perfectoid field K the absolute Galois groups of K and K^{♭} are isomorphic.

== See also ==
- Perfect field
