= Ofer Gabber =

Israeli mathematician

- עופר גאבר
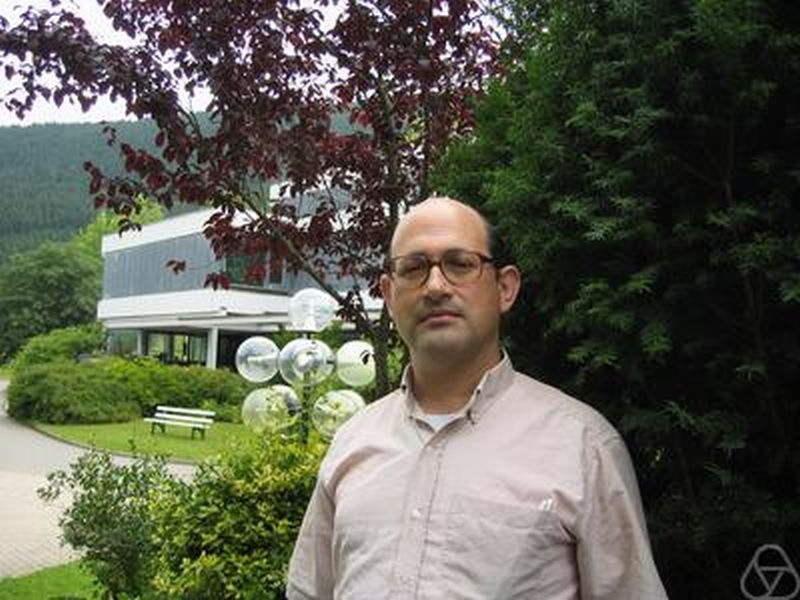
- Born: May 16, 1958 (age 68)
- Education: Harvard University
- Known for: Algebraic geometry
- Awards: Erdős Prize (1981), Prix Thérèse Gautier (2011)
- Scientific career
- Fields: Mathematics
- Workplaces: Institut des Hautes Études Scientifiques
- Doctoral advisor: Barry Mazur

Ofer Gabber (Hebrew: עופר גאבר; born May 16, 1958) is a mathematician working in algebraic geometry.

== Life ==
In 1978 Gabber received a Ph.D. from Harvard University for the thesis Some theorems on Azumaya algebras, written under the supervision of Barry Mazur. Gabber has been at the Institut des Hautes Études Scientifiques in Bures-sur-Yvette in Paris since 1984 as a CNRS senior researcher. He won the Erdős Prize in 1981 and the Prix Thérèse Gautier from the French Academy of Sciences in 2011. In 1981 Gabber with Victor Kac published a proof of a conjecture stated by Kac in 1968.

== Books ==
- With Lorenzo Ramero: Almost Ring Theory, Springer, Lecture Notes in Computer Science, vol 1800, 2003.
- With Brian Conrad, Gopal Prasad: Pseudo-reductive Groups, Cambridge University Press, 2010; 2015, 2nd edition

== See also ==
- Gabber rigidity
- Almost ring theory
- t-structure
- Theorem of absolute purity
