= Ran space =

Topological space

In mathematics, the Ran space (or Ran's space) of a topological space X is a topological space $\operatorname{Ran}(X)$ whose underlying set is the set of all nonempty finite subsets of X: for a metric space X the topology is induced by the Hausdorff distance. The notion is named after Ziv Ran.

== Definition ==
In general, the topology of the Ran space is generated by sets

$$\{ S \in \operatorname{Ran}(U_1 \cup \dots \cup U_m) \mid S \cap U_1 \ne \emptyset, \dots, S \cap U_m \ne \emptyset \}$$

for any disjoint open subsets $U_i \subset X, i = 1, ..., m$.

There is an analog of a Ran space for a scheme: the Ran prestack of a quasi-projective scheme X over a field k, denoted by $\operatorname{Ran}(X)$, is the category whose objects are triples $(R, S, \mu)$ consisting of a finitely generated k-algebra R, a nonempty set S and a map of sets $\mu: S \to X(R)$, and whose morphisms $(R, S, \mu) \to (R', S', \mu')$ consist of a k-algebra homomorphism $R \to R'$ and a surjective map $S \to S'$ that commutes with $\mu$ and $\mu'$. Roughly, an R-point of $\operatorname{Ran}(X)$ is a nonempty finite set of R-rational points of X "with labels" given by $\mu$. A theorem of Beilinson and Drinfeld continues to hold: $\operatorname{Ran}(X)$ is acyclic if X is connected.

== Properties ==
A theorem of Beilinson and Drinfeld states that the Ran space of a connected manifold is weakly contractible.

== Topological chiral homology ==
If F is a cosheaf on the Ran space $\operatorname{Ran}(M)$, then its space of global sections is called the topological chiral homology of M with coefficients in F. If A is, roughly, a family of commutative algebras parametrized by points in M, then there is a factorizable sheaf associated to A. Via this construction, one also obtains the topological chiral homology with coefficients in A. The construction is a generalization of Hochschild homology.

== See also ==
- Chiral homology
