= Discrete orthogonal polynomials =

In mathematics, a sequence of discrete orthogonal polynomials is a sequence of polynomials that are pairwise orthogonal with respect to a discrete measure. Examples include the discrete Chebyshev polynomials, Charlier polynomials, Krawtchouk polynomials, Meixner polynomials, dual Hahn polynomials, Hahn polynomials, and Racah polynomials.

If the measure has finite support, then the corresponding sequence of discrete orthogonal polynomials has only a finite number of elements. The Racah polynomials give an example of this.

== Definition ==
Consider a discrete measure $\mu$ on some set $S=\{s_0,s_1,\dots\}$ with weight function $\omega(x)$.

A family of orthogonal polynomials $\{p_n(x)\}$ is called discrete if they are orthogonal with respect to $\omega$ (resp. $\mu$), i.e.,

$$\sum\limits_{x\in S} p_n(x)p_m(x)\omega(x)=\kappa_n\delta_{n,m},$$

where $\delta_{n,m}$ is the Kronecker delta.

=== Remark ===
Any discrete measure is of the form

$$\mu = \sum_{i} a_i \delta_{s_i}$$,

so one can define a weight function by $\omega(s_i) = a_i$.

== Literature ==
- Baik, Jinho; Kriecherbauer, T.; McLaughlin, K. T.-R.; Miller, P. D. (2007), Discrete orthogonal polynomials. Asymptotics and applications, Annals of Mathematics Studies, vol. 164, Princeton University Press, ISBN 978-0-691-12734-7, MR 2283089
