= Vertex operator algebra =

Algebra used in 2D conformal field theories and string theory

In mathematics, a vertex operator algebra (VOA) is an algebraic structure that plays an important role in two-dimensional conformal field theory and string theory. In addition to physical applications, vertex operator algebras have proven useful in purely mathematical contexts such as monstrous moonshine and the geometric Langlands correspondence.

The related notion of vertex algebra was introduced by Richard Borcherds in 1986, motivated by a construction of an infinite-dimensional Lie algebra due to Igor Frenkel. In the course of this construction, one employs a Fock space that admits an action of vertex operators attached to elements of a lattice. Borcherds formulated the notion of vertex algebra by axiomatizing the relations between the lattice vertex operators, producing an algebraic structure that allows one to construct new Lie algebras by following Frenkel's method.

The notion of vertex operator algebra was introduced as a modification of the notion of vertex algebra, by Frenkel, James Lepowsky, and Arne Meurman in 1988, as part of their project to construct the moonshine module. They observed that many vertex algebras that appear 'in nature' carry an action of the Virasoro algebra, and satisfy a bounded-below property with respect to an energy operator. Motivated by this observation, they added the Virasoro action and bounded-below property as axioms.

We now have post-hoc motivation for these notions from physics, together with several interpretations of the axioms that were not initially known. Physically, the vertex operators arising from holomorphic field insertions at points in two-dimensional conformal field theory admit operator product expansions when insertions collide, and these satisfy precisely the relations specified in the definition of vertex operator algebra. Indeed, the axioms of a vertex operator algebra are a formal algebraic interpretation of what physicists call chiral algebras (not to be confused with the more precise notion with the same name in mathematics) or "algebras of chiral symmetries", where these symmetries describe the Ward identities satisfied by a given conformal field theory, including conformal invariance. Other formulations of the vertex algebra axioms include Borcherds's later work on singular commutative rings, algebras over certain operads on curves introduced by Huang, Kriz, and others, D-module-theoretic objects called chiral algebras introduced by Alexander Beilinson and Vladimir Drinfeld and factorization algebras, also introduced by Beilinson and Drinfeld.

Important basic examples of vertex operator algebras include the lattice VOAs (modeling lattice conformal field theories), VOAs given by representations of affine Kac–Moody algebras (from the WZW model), the Virasoro VOAs, which are VOAs corresponding to representations of the Virasoro algebra, and the moonshine module V^{♮}, which is distinguished by its monster symmetry. More sophisticated examples such as affine W-algebras and the chiral de Rham complex on a complex manifold arise in geometric representation theory and mathematical physics.

== Formal definition ==
=== Vertex algebra ===
A vertex algebra is a collection of data that satisfy certain axioms.

==== Data ====
- a vector space $V$, called the space of states. The underlying field is typically taken to be the complex numbers, although Borcherds's original formulation allowed for an arbitrary commutative ring.
- an identity element $1\in V$, sometimes written $|0\rangle$ or $\Omega$ to indicate a vacuum state.
- an endomorphism $T:V\rightarrow V$, called "translation". (Borcherds's original formulation included a system of divided powers of $T$, because he did not assume the ground ring was divisible.)
- a linear multiplication map $Y:V\otimes V\rightarrow V((z))$, where $V((z))$ is the space of all formal Laurent series with coefficients in $V$. This structure has some alternative presentations:
  - as an infinite collection of bilinear products $\cdot_n : u \otimes v \mapsto u_n v$ where $n \in \mathbb{Z}$ and $u_n \in \mathrm{End}(V)$, so that for each $v$, there is an $N$ such that $u_n v = 0$ for $n < N$.
  - as a left-multiplication map $V\rightarrow \mathrm{End}(V)[[z^{\pm 1}]]$. This is the 'state-to-field' map of the so-called state-field correspondence. For each $u\in V$, the endomorphism-valued formal distribution $Y(u,z)$ is called a vertex operator or a field, and the coefficient of $z^{-n-1}$ is the operator $u_{n}$. In the context of vertex algebras, a field is more precisely an element of $\mathrm{End}(V)[[z^{\pm 1}]]$, which can be written $A(z) = \sum_{n \in \mathbb{Z}}A_n z^n, A_n \in \mathrm{End}(V)$ such that for any $v \in V, A_n v = 0$ for sufficiently small $n$ (which may depend on $v$). The standard notation for the multiplication is

$$u \otimes v \mapsto Y(u,z)v = \sum_{n \in \mathbf{Z}} u_n v z^{-n-1}.$$

==== Axioms ====
These data are required to satisfy the following axioms:

- Identity. For any $u\in V\,,\,Y(1,z)u=u$ and $\,Y(u,z)1\in u+zV[[z]]$. (Note: This last axiom can be used to provide a 'field-to-state' map for the state-field correspondence)
- Translation. $T(1)=0$, and for any $u,v\in V$,

$$[T,Y(u,z)]v = TY(u,z)v - Y(u,z)Tv = \frac{d}{dz}Y(u,z)v$$

- Locality (Jacobi identity, or Borcherds identity). For any $u,v\in V$, there exists a positive integer N such that:

$$(z-x)^N Y(u, z) Y(v, x) = (z-x)^N Y(v, x) Y(u, z).$$

===== Equivalent formulations of locality axiom =====
The locality axiom has several equivalent formulations in the literature, e.g., Frenkel–Lepowsky–Meurman introduced the Jacobi identity: $\forall u,v,w\in V$,

$$\begin{aligned}&z^{-1}\delta\left(\frac{x-y}{z}\right)Y(u,x)Y(v,y)w - z^{-1}\delta\left(\frac{-y+x}{z}\right)Y(v,y)Y(u,x)w \\&= y^{-1}\delta\left(\frac{x-z}{y}\right)Y(Y(u,z)v,y)w\end{aligned},$$

where we define the formal delta series by:

$$\delta\left(\frac{x-y}{z}\right) := \sum_{s \geq 0, r \in \mathbf{Z}} \binom{r}{s} (-1)^s y^{r-s}x^s z^{-r}.$$

Borcherds initially used the following two identities: for any $u,v,w\in V$ and integers $m,n$ we have

$$(u_m (v))_n (w) = \sum_{i \geq 0} (-1)^i \binom{m}{i} \left (u_{m-i} (v_{n+i} (w)) - (-1)^m v_{m+n-i} (u_i (w)) \right)$$

and

$$u_m v=\sum_{i\geq 0}(-1)^{m+i+1}\frac{T^{i}}{i!}v_{m+i}u$$.

He later gave a more expansive version that is equivalent but easier to use: for any $u,v,w\in V$ and integers $m,n,q$ we have

$$\sum_{i \in \mathbf{Z}} \binom{m}{i} \left(u_{q+i} (v) \right )_{m+n-i} (w) = \sum_{i\in \mathbf{Z}} (-1)^i \binom{q}{i} \left (u_{m+q-i} \left(v_{n+i} (w) \right ) - (-1)^q v_{n+q-i} \left (u_{m+i} (w) \right ) \right)$$

This identity is the same as the Jacobi identity by expanding both sides in all formal variables. Finally, there is a formal function version of locality: For any $u,v,w\in V$, there is an element

$$X(u,v,w;z,x) \in V[[z,x]] \left[z^{-1}, x^{-1}, (z-x)^{-1} \right]$$

such that $Y(u,z)Y(v,x)w$ and $Y(v,x)Y(u,z)w$ are the corresponding expansions of $X(u,v,w;z,x)$ in $V((z))((x))$ and $V((x))((z))$.

=== Vertex operator algebra ===
A vertex operator algebra is a vertex algebra equipped with a conformal element $\omega \in V$, such that the vertex operator $Y(\omega,z)$ is the weight two Virasoro field $L(z)$:

$$Y(\omega, z) = \sum_{n\in\mathbf{Z}} \omega_{n} {z^{-n-1}} = L(z) = \sum_{n\in\mathbf{Z}} L_n z^{-n-2}$$

and satisfies the following properties:

- $[L_m,L_n]=(m-n)L_{m+n}+\frac{1}{12}\delta_{m+n,0}(m^3-m)c\,\mathrm{Id}_V$, where $c$ is a constant called the central charge, or rank of $V$. In particular, the coefficients of this vertex operator endow $V$ with an action of the Virasoro algebra with central charge $c$.
- $L_0$ acts semisimply on $V$ with integer eigenvalues that are bounded below.
- Under the grading provided by the eigenvalues of $L_0$, the multiplication on $V$ is homogeneous in the sense that if $u$ and $v$ are homogeneous, then $u_n v$ is homogeneous of degree $\mathrm{deg}(u)+\mathrm{deg}(v)-n-1$.
- The identity $1$ has degree 0, and the conformal element $\omega$ has degree 2.
- $L_{-1}=T$.

A homomorphism of vertex algebras is a map of the underlying vector spaces that respects the additional identity, translation, and multiplication structure. Homomorphisms of vertex operator algebras have "weak" and "strong" forms, depending on whether they respect conformal vectors.

== Commutative vertex algebras ==
A vertex algebra $V$ is commutative if all vertex operators $Y(u,z)$ commute with each other. This is equivalent to the property that all products $Y(u,z)v$ lie in $V[[z]]$, or that $Y(u, z) \in \operatorname{End}[[z]]$. Thus, an alternative definition for a commutative vertex algebra is one in which all vertex operators $Y(u,z)$ are regular at $z = 0$.

Given a commutative vertex algebra, the constant terms of multiplication endow the vector space with a commutative and associative ring structure, the vacuum vector $1$ is a unit and $T$ is a derivation. Hence the commutative vertex algebra equips $V$ with the structure of a commutative unital algebra with derivation. Conversely, any commutative ring $V$ with derivation $T$ has a canonical vertex algebra structure, where we set $Y(u,z)v=u_{-1}vz^0=uv$, so that $Y$ restricts to a map $Y:V \rightarrow \operatorname{End}(V)$ which is the multiplication map $u \mapsto u \cdot$ with $\cdot$ the algebra product. If the derivation $T$ vanishes, we may set $\omega=0$ to obtain a vertex operator algebra concentrated in degree zero.

Any finite-dimensional vertex algebra is commutative.

Proof

This follows from the translation axiom. From $[T, Y(u,z)] = \partial_z Y(u,z)$ and expanding the vertex operator as a power series one obtains
$$\operatorname{ad}T u_n = [T, u_n] = -nu_{n-1}.$$
Then
$$\operatorname{ad}T^m u_n = (-1)^m n (n-1) \cdots (n - m + 1) u_{n-m}.$$
From here, we fix $n$ to always be non-negative. For $m > n$, we have $\operatorname{ad}T^m u_n = 0$. Now since $V$ is finite dimensional, so is $\operatorname{End}(V)$, and all the $u_n$ are elements of $\operatorname{End}(V)$. So a finite number of the $u_n$ span the vector subspace of $\operatorname{End}(V)$ spanned by all the $u_n$. Therefore there's an $M$ such that $\operatorname{ad}T^M u_n = 0$ for all $u_n$. But also,
$$\operatorname{ad}T^M u_{M + n} = (-1)^m (M + n + 1)\cdots(n+1)u_n$$
and the left hand side is zero, while the coefficient in front of $u_n$ is non-zero. So $u_n = 0$. So $Y(u,z)$ is regular. $\square$

Thus even the smallest examples of noncommutative vertex algebras require significant introduction.

== Basic properties ==
The translation operator $T$ in a vertex algebra induces infinitesimal symmetries on the product structure, and satisfies the following properties:

- $\,Y(u,z)1=e^{zT}u$
- $\,Tu=u_{-2}1$, so $T$ is determined by $Y$.
- $\,Y(Tu,z)=\frac{\mathrm{d}Y(u,z)}{\mathrm{d}z}$
- $\,e^{xT}Y(u,z)e^{-xT}=Y(e^{xT}u,z)=Y(u,z+x)$
- (skew-symmetry) $Y(u,z)v=e^{zT}Y(v,-z)u$

For a vertex operator algebra, the other Virasoro operators satisfy similar properties:

- $\,x^{L_0}Y(u,z)x^{-L_0}=Y(x^{L_0}u,xz)$
- $\,e^{xL_1}Y(u,z)e^{-xL_1}=Y(e^{x(1-xz)L_1}(1-xz)^{-2L_0}u,z(1-xz)^{-1})$
- (quasi-conformality) $[L_m, Y(u,z)] = \sum_{k=0}^{m+1} \binom{m+1}{k} z^k Y(L_{m-k}u, z)$ for all $m\geq -1$.
- (Associativity, or Cousin property): For any $u,v,w\in V$, the element

$$X(u,v,w;z,x) \in V[[z,x]][z^{-1}, x^{-1}, (z-x)^{-1}]$$

given in the definition also expands to $Y(Y(u,z-x)v,x)w$ in $V((x))((z-x))$.

The associativity property of a vertex algebra follows from the fact that the commutator of $Y(u,z)$ and $Y(v,x)$ is annihilated by a finite power of $z-x$, i.e., one can expand it as a finite linear combination of derivatives of the formal delta function in $(z-x)$, with coefficients in $\mathrm{End}(V)$.

Reconstruction: Let $V$ be a vertex algebra, and let $J_a$ be a set of vectors, with corresponding fields $J^a(z)\in \mathrm{End}(V)[[z^{\pm 1}]]$. If $V$ is spanned by monomials in the positive weight coefficients of the fields (i.e., finite products of operators $J^{a}_{n}$ applied to $1$, where $n$ is negative), then we may write the operator product of such a monomial as a normally ordered product of divided power derivatives of fields (here, normal ordering means polar terms on the left are moved to the right). Specifically,

$$Y(J^{a_1}_{n_1+1}J^{a_2}_{n_2+1}...J^{a_k}_{n_k+1}1, z) = :\frac{\partial^{n_1}}{\partial z^{n_1}}\frac{J^{a_1}(z)}{n_1!}\frac{\partial^{n_2}}{\partial z^{n_2}}\frac{J^{a_2}(z)}{n_2!} \cdots \frac{\partial^{n_k}}{\partial z^{n_k}}\frac{J^{a_k}(z)}{n_k!}:$$

More generally, if one is given a vector space $V$ with an endomorphism $T$ and vector $1$, and one assigns to a set of vectors $J^a$ a set of fields $J^a(z)\in \mathrm{End}(V)[[z^{\pm 1}]]$ that are mutually local, whose positive weight coefficients generate $V$, and that satisfy the identity and translation conditions, then the previous formula describes a vertex algebra structure.

=== Operator product expansion ===
In vertex algebra theory, due to associativity, we can abuse notation to write, for $A, B, C \in V,$
$$Y(A, z)Y(B,w)C = \sum_{n \in \mathbb{Z}}\frac{Y(A_{(n)}\cdot B, w)}{(z-w)^{n+1}}C.$$
This is the operator product expansion. Equivalently,
$$Y(A, z)Y(B,w) = \sum_{n \geq 0}\frac{Y(A_{(n)}\cdot B, w)}{(z-w)^{n+1}} + :Y(A,z)Y(B,w):.$$
Since the normal ordered part is regular in $z$ and $w$, this can be written more in line with physics conventions as
$$Y(A, z)Y(B,w) \sim \sum_{n \geq 0}\frac{Y(A_{(n)}\cdot B, w)}{(z-w)^{n+1}},$$
where the equivalence relation $\sim$ denotes equivalence up to regular terms.

==== Commonly used OPEs ====
Here some OPEs frequently found in conformal field theory are recorded.

OPEs
| 1st distribution | 2nd distribution | Commutation relations | OPE | Name | Notes |
|---|---|---|---|---|---|
| $a(z) = \sum a_m z^{-m-1}$ | $b(w) = \sum b_n z^{-n-1}$ | $[a_m, b_n] = c_{m+n}$ | $a(z)b(w) \sim \frac{\sum c_nw^{-n-1}}{z-w}$ | Generic OPE | |
| $a(z) = \sum a_m z^{-m-1}$ | $b(w) = \sum b_n z^{-n-1}$ | $[a_m, b_n] = m \delta_{m+n,0}$ | $a(z)b(w) \sim \frac{1}{(z-w)^2}$ | Free boson OPE | Invariance under $z \leftrightarrow w$ shows 'bosonic' nature of this OPE. |
| $L(z) = \sum L_m z^{-m-2}$ | $a(w) = \sum a_n w^{-n-\Delta}$ | $[L_m, a_n] = ((\Delta - 1)m - n)a_{m+n}$ | $L(z)a(w) \sim \frac{\Delta a(w)}{(z-w)^2} + \frac{\partial a(w)}{z-w}$ | Primary field OPE | Primary fields are defined to be fields a(z) satisfying this OPE when multiplied with the Virasoro field. These are important as they are the fields which transform 'like tensors' under coordinate transformations of the worldsheet in string theory. |
| $L(z) = \sum L_m z^{-m-2}$ | $L(w) = \sum L_n z^{-n-2}$ | $[L_m, L_n] = (m-n)L_{m+n} + \frac{m^3 - m}{12}\delta_{m+n,0}c$ | $L(z)L(w) \sim \frac{c/2}{(z-w)^4} + \frac{2L(w)}{(z-w)^2} + \frac{\partial L(w)}{z-w}$ | TT OPE | In physics, the Virasoro field is often identified with the stress-energy tensor and labelled T(z) rather than L(z). |

== Examples from Lie algebras ==
The basic examples come from infinite-dimensional Lie algebras.

=== Heisenberg vertex operator algebra ===
A basic example of a noncommutative vertex algebra is the rank 1 free boson, also called the Heisenberg vertex operator algebra. It is "generated" by a single vector b, in the sense that by applying the coefficients of the field b(z) := Y(b,z) to the vector 1, we obtain a spanning set. The underlying vector space is the infinite-variable polynomial ring $\mathbb{C}[b_{-1}, b_{-2}, \cdots]$, where for positive $n$, $b_{-n}$ acts obviously by multiplication, and $b_n$ acts as $n\partial_{b_{-n}}$. The action of b_{0} is multiplication by zero, producing the "momentum zero" Fock representation V_{0} of the Heisenberg Lie algebra (generated by b_{n} for integers n, with commutation relations [b_{n},b_{m}]=n δ_{n,–m}), induced by the trivial representation of the subalgebra spanned by b_{n}, n ≥ 0.

The Fock space V_{0} can be made into a vertex algebra by the following definition of the state-operator map on a basis $b_{j_1}b_{j_2}...b_{j_k}$ with each $j_i < 0$,

$$Y( b_{j_1}b_{j_2}...b_{j_k}, z) := \frac{1}{(-j_1 - 1)!(-j_2 - 1)!\cdots (-j_k - 1)!}:\partial^{-j_1 - 1}b(z)\partial^{-j_2 - 1}b(z)...\partial^{-j_k - 1}b(z):$$

where $:\mathcal{O}:$ denotes normal ordering of an operator $\mathcal{O}$. The vertex operators may also be written as a functional of a multivariable function f as:

$$Y[f,z] \equiv :f\left(\frac{b(z)}{0!},\frac{b'(z)}{1!},\frac{b''(z)}{2!},...\right):$$

if we understand that each term in the expansion of f is normal ordered.

The rank n free boson is given by taking an n-fold tensor product of the rank 1 free boson. For any vector b in n-dimensional space, one has a field b(z) whose coefficients are elements of the rank n Heisenberg algebra, whose commutation relations have an extra inner product term: [b_{n},c_{m}]=n (b,c) δ_{n,–m}.

The Heisenberg vertex operator algebra has a one-parameter family of conformal vectors with parameter $\lambda \in \mathbb{C}$ of conformal vectors $\omega_\lambda$ given by

$$\omega_\lambda = \frac{1}{2}b_{-1}^2 + \lambda b_{-2},$$

with central charge $c_\lambda = 1 - 12\lambda^2$.

When $\lambda = 0$, there is the following formula for the Virasoro character:

$$Tr_V q^{L_0} := \sum_{n \in \mathbf{Z}} \dim V_n q^n = \prod_{n \geq 1} (1-q^n)^{-1}$$

This is the generating function for partitions, and is also written as q^{1/24} times the weight −1/2 modular form 1/η (the reciprocal of the Dedekind eta function). The rank n free boson then has an n parameter family of Virasoro vectors, and when those parameters are zero, the character is q^{n/24} times the weight −n/2 modular form η^{−n}.

=== Virasoro vertex operator algebra ===
Virasoro vertex operator algebras are important for two reasons: First, the conformal element in a vertex operator algebra canonically induces a homomorphism from a Virasoro vertex operator algebra, so they play a universal role in the theory. Second, they are intimately connected to the theory of unitary representations of the Virasoro algebra, and these play a major role in conformal field theory. In particular, the unitary Virasoro minimal models are simple quotients of these vertex algebras, and their tensor products provide a way to combinatorially construct more complicated vertex operator algebras.

The Virasoro vertex operator algebra is defined as an induced representation of the Virasoro algebra: If we choose a central charge c, there is a unique one-dimensional module for the subalgebra C[z]∂_{z} + K for which K acts by cId, and C[z]∂_{z} acts trivially, and the corresponding induced module is spanned by polynomials in L_{–n} = –z^{−n–1}∂_{z} as n ranges over integers greater than 1. The module then has partition function

$$Tr_V q^{L_0} = \sum_{n \in \mathbf{R}} \dim V_n q^n = \prod_{n \geq 2} (1-q^n)^{-1}$$.

This space has a vertex operator algebra structure, where the vertex operators are defined by:

$$Y(L_{-n_1-2}L_{-n_2-2}...L_{-n_k-2}|0\rangle,z) \equiv \frac{1}{n_1!n_2!..n_k!}:\partial^{n_1}L(z)\partial^{n_2}L(z)...\partial^{n_k}L(z):$$

and $\omega = L_{-2}|0\rangle$. The fact that the Virasoro field L(z) is local with respect to itself can be deduced from the formula for its self-commutator:

$[L(z),L(x)] =\left(\frac{\partial}{\partial x}L(x)\right)w^{-1}\delta \left(\frac{z}{x}\right)-2L(x)x^{-1}\frac{\partial}{\partial z}\delta \left(\frac{z}{x}\right)-\frac{1}{12}cx^{-1}\left(\frac{\partial}{\partial z}\right)^3\delta \left(\frac{z}{x}\right)$

where c is the central charge.

Given a vertex algebra homomorphism from a Virasoro vertex algebra of central charge c to any other vertex algebra, the vertex operator attached to the image of ω automatically satisfies the Virasoro relations, i.e., the image of ω is a conformal vector. Conversely, any conformal vector in a vertex algebra induces a distinguished vertex algebra homomorphism from some Virasoro vertex operator algebra.

The Virasoro vertex operator algebras are simple, except when c has the form 1–6(p–q)^{2}/pq for coprime integers p,q strictly greater than 1 – this follows from Kac's determinant formula. In these exceptional cases, one has a unique maximal ideal, and the corresponding quotient is called a minimal model. When p = q+1, the vertex algebras are unitary representations of Virasoro, and their modules are known as discrete series representations. They play an important role in conformal field theory in part because they are unusually tractable, and for small p, they correspond to well-known statistical mechanics systems at criticality, e.g., the Ising model, the tri-critical Ising model, the three-state Potts model, etc. By work of Weiqang Wang concerning fusion rules, we have a full description of the tensor categories of unitary minimal models. For example, when c=1/2 (Ising), there are three irreducible modules with lowest L_{0}-weight 0, 1/2, and 1/16, and its fusion ring is Z[x,y]/(x^{2}–1, y^{2}–x–1, xy–y).

=== Affine vertex algebra ===
By replacing the Heisenberg Lie algebra with an untwisted affine Kac–Moody Lie algebra (i.e., the universal central extension of the loop algebra on a finite-dimensional simple Lie algebra), one may construct the vacuum representation in much the same way as the free boson vertex algebra is constructed. This algebra arises as the current algebra of the Wess–Zumino–Witten model, which produces the anomaly that is interpreted as the central extension.

Concretely, pulling back the central extension

$$0 \to \mathbb{C} \to \hat{\mathfrak{g}} \to \mathfrak{g}[t,t^{-1}] \to 0$$

along the inclusion $\mathfrak{g}[t] \to \mathfrak{g}[t,t^{-1}]$ yields a split extension, and the vacuum module is induced from the one-dimensional representation of the latter on which a central basis element acts by some chosen constant called the "level". Since central elements can be identified with invariant inner products on the finite type Lie algebra $\mathfrak{g}$, one typically normalizes the level so that the Killing form has level twice the dual Coxeter number. Equivalently, level one gives the inner product for which the longest root has norm 2. This matches the loop algebra convention, where levels are discretized by third cohomology of simply connected compact Lie groups.

By choosing a basis J^{a} of the finite type Lie algebra, one may form a basis of the affine Lie algebra using J^{a}_{n} = J^{a} t^{n} together with a central element K. By reconstruction, we can describe the vertex operators by normal ordered products of derivatives of the fields

$$J^a(z) = \sum_{n=-\infty}^\infty J^a_n z^{-n-1} = \sum_{n=-\infty}^\infty (J^a t^n) z^{-n-1}.$$

When the level is non-critical, i.e., the inner product is not minus one half of the Killing form, the vacuum representation has a conformal element, given by the Sugawara construction. (Note: The history of the Sugawara construction is complicated, with several attempts required to get the formula correct.) For any choice of dual bases J^{a}, J_{a} with respect to the level 1 inner product, the conformal element is

$$\omega = \frac{1}{2(k+h^\vee)} \sum_a J_{a,-1} J^a_{-1} 1$$

and yields a vertex operator algebra whose central charge is $k \cdot \dim \mathfrak{g}/(k+h^\vee)$. At critical level, the conformal structure is destroyed, since the denominator is zero, but one may produce operators L_{n} for n ≥ –1 by taking a limit as k approaches criticality.

== Modules ==
Much like ordinary rings, vertex algebras admit a notion of module, or representation. Modules play an important role in conformal field theory, where they are often called sectors. A standard assumption in the physics literature is that the full Hilbert space of a conformal field theory decomposes into a sum of tensor products of left-moving and right-moving sectors:

$$\mathcal{H} \cong \bigoplus_{i \in I} M_i \otimes \overline{M_i}$$

That is, a conformal field theory has a vertex operator algebra of left-moving chiral symmetries, a vertex operator algebra of right-moving chiral symmetries, and the sectors moving in a given direction are modules for the corresponding vertex operator algebra.

=== Definition ===
Given a vertex algebra V with multiplication Y, a V-module is a vector space M equipped with an action Y^{M}: V ⊗ M → M((z)), satisfying the following conditions:

(Identity) Y^{M}(1,z) = Id_{M}
(Associativity, or Jacobi identity) For any u, v ∈ V, w ∈ M, there is an element

$$X(u,v,w;z,x) \in M[[z,x]][z^{-1}, x^{-1}, (z-x)^{-1}]$$

such that Y^{M}(u,z)Y^{M}(v,x)w and Y^{M}(Y(u,z–x)v,x)w are the corresponding expansions of $X(u,v,w;z,x)$ in M((z))((x)) and M((x))((z–x)). Equivalently, the following "Jacobi identity" holds:

$$z^{-1}\delta\left(\frac{y-x}{z}\right)Y^M(u,x)Y^M(v,y)w - z^{-1}\delta\left(\frac{-y+x}{z}\right)Y^M(v,y)Y^M(u,x)w = y^{-1}\delta\left(\frac{x+z}{y}\right)Y^M(Y(u,z)v,y)w.$$

The modules of a vertex algebra form an abelian category. When working with vertex operator algebras, the previous definition is sometimes given the name weak $V$-module, and genuine V-modules must respect the conformal structure given by the conformal vector $\omega$. More precisely, they are required to satisfy the additional condition that L_{0} acts semisimply with finite-dimensional eigenspaces and eigenvalues bounded below in each coset of Z. Work of Huang, Lepowsky, Miyamoto, and Zhang has shown at various levels of generality that modules of a vertex operator algebra admit a fusion tensor product operation, and form a braided tensor category.

When the category of V-modules is semisimple with finitely many irreducible objects, the vertex operator algebra V is called rational. Rational vertex operator algebras satisfying an additional finiteness hypothesis (known as Zhu's C_{2}-cofiniteness condition) are known to be particularly well-behaved, and are called regular. For example, Zhu's 1996 modular invariance theorem asserts that the characters of modules of a regular VOA form a vector-valued representation of $\mathrm{SL}(2, \mathbb{Z})$. In particular, if a VOA is holomorphic, that is, its representation category is equivalent to that of vector spaces, then its partition function is $\mathrm{SL}(2, \mathbb{Z})$-invariant up to a constant. Huang showed that the category of modules of a regular VOA is a modular tensor category, and its fusion rules satisfy the Verlinde formula.

=== Heisenberg algebra modules ===
Modules of the Heisenberg algebra can be constructed as Fock spaces $\pi_\lambda$ for $\lambda \in \mathbb{C}$ which are induced representations of the Heisenberg Lie algebra, given by a vacuum vector $v_\lambda$ satisfying $b_nv_\lambda = 0$ for $n > 0$, $b_0v_\lambda = 0$, and being acted on freely by the negative modes $b_{-n}$ for $n>0$. The space can be written as $\mathbb{C}[b_{-1}, b_{-2}, \cdots]v_\lambda$. Every irreducible, $\mathbb{Z}$-graded Heisenberg algebra module with gradation bounded below is of this form.

These are used to construct lattice vertex algebras, which as vector spaces are direct sums of Heisenberg modules, when the image of $Y$ is extended appropriately to module elements.

The module category is not semisimple, since one may induce a representation of the abelian Lie algebra where b_{0} acts by a nontrivial Jordan block. For the rank n free boson, one has an irreducible module V_{λ} for each vector λ in complex n-dimensional space. Each vector b ∈ C^{n} yields the operator b_{0}, and the Fock space V_{λ} is distinguished by the property that each such b_{0} acts as scalar multiplication by the inner product (b, λ).

=== Twisted modules ===
Unlike ordinary rings, vertex algebras admit a notion of twisted module attached to an automorphism. For an automorphism σ of order N, the action has the form V ⊗ M → M((z^{1/N})), with the following monodromy condition: if u ∈ V satisfies σ u = exp(2πik/N)u, then u_{n} = 0 unless n satisfies n+k/N ∈ Z (there is some disagreement about signs among specialists). Geometrically, twisted modules can be attached to branch points on an algebraic curve with a ramified Galois cover. In the conformal field theory literature, twisted modules are called twisted sectors, and are intimately connected with string theory on orbifolds.

== Additional examples ==
=== Vertex operator algebra defined by an even lattice ===
The lattice vertex algebra construction was the original motivation for defining vertex algebras. It is constructed by taking a sum of irreducible modules for the Heisenberg algebra corresponding to lattice vectors, and defining a multiplication operation by specifying intertwining operators between them. That is, if Λ is an even lattice (if the lattice is not even, the structure obtained is instead a vertex superalgebra), the lattice vertex algebra V_{Λ} decomposes into free bosonic modules as:

$$V_\Lambda \cong \bigoplus_{\lambda \in \Lambda} V_\lambda$$

Lattice vertex algebras are canonically attached to double covers of even integral lattices, rather than the lattices themselves. While each such lattice has a unique lattice vertex algebra up to isomorphism, the vertex algebra construction is not functorial, because lattice automorphisms have an ambiguity in lifting.

The double covers in question are uniquely determined up to isomorphism by the following rule: elements have the form ±e_{α} for lattice vectors α ∈ Λ (i.e., there is a map to Λ sending e_{α} to α that forgets signs), and multiplication satisfies the relations e_{α}e_{β} = (–1)^{(α,β)}e_{β}e_{α}. Another way to describe this is that given an even lattice Λ, there is a unique (up to coboundary) normalised cocycle ε(α, β) with values ±1 such that (−1)^{(α,β)} = ε(α, β) ε(β, α), where the normalization condition is that ε(α, 0) = ε(0, α) = 1 for all α ∈ Λ. This cocycle induces a central extension of Λ by a group of order 2, and we obtain a twisted group ring C_{ε}[Λ] with basis e_{α} (α ∈ Λ), and multiplication rule e_{α}e_{β} = ε(α, β)e_{α+β} – the cocycle condition on ε ensures associativity of the ring.

The vertex operator attached to lowest weight vector v_{λ} in the Fock space V_{λ} is

$$Y(v_\lambda,z) = e_\lambda :\exp \int \lambda(z): = e_\lambda z^\lambda \exp \left (\sum_{n<0} \lambda_n \frac{z^{-n}}{n} \right )\exp \left (\sum_{n>0} \lambda_n \frac{z^{-n}}{n} \right ),$$

where z^{λ} is a shorthand for the linear map that takes any element of the α-Fock space V_{α} to the monomial z^{(λ,α)}. The vertex operators for other elements of the Fock space are then determined by reconstruction.

As in the case of the free boson, one has a choice of conformal vector, given by an element s of the vector space Λ ⊗ C, but the condition that the extra Fock spaces have integer L_{0} eigenvalues constrains the choice of s: for an orthonormal basis x_{i}, the vector 1/2 x_{i,1}^{2} + s_{2} must satisfy (s, λ) ∈ Z for all λ ∈ Λ, i.e., s lies in the dual lattice.

If the even lattice Λ is generated by its "root vectors" (those satisfying (α, α)=2), and any two root vectors are joined by a chain of root vectors with consecutive inner products non-zero then the vertex operator algebra is the unique simple quotient of the vacuum module of the affine Kac–Moody algebra of the corresponding simply laced simple Lie algebra at level one. This is known as the Frenkel–Kac (or Frenkel–Kac–Segal) construction, and is based on the earlier construction by Sergio Fubini and Gabriele Veneziano of the tachyonic vertex operator in the dual resonance model. Among other features, the zero modes of the vertex operators corresponding to root vectors give a construction of the underlying simple Lie algebra, related to a presentation originally due to Jacques Tits. In particular, one obtains a construction of all ADE type Lie groups directly from their root lattices. And this is commonly considered the simplest way to construct the 248-dimensional group E_{8}.

=== Monster vertex algebra ===
The monster vertex algebra $V^\natural$ (also called the "moonshine module") is the key to Borcherds's proof of the Monstrous moonshine conjectures. It was constructed by Frenkel, Lepowsky, and Meurman in 1988. It is notable because its character is the j-invariant with no constant term, $j(\tau) - 744$, and its automorphism group is the monster group. It is constructed by orbifolding the lattice vertex algebra constructed from the Leech lattice by the order 2 automorphism induced by reflecting the Leech lattice in the origin. That is, one forms the direct sum of the Leech lattice VOA with the twisted module, and takes the fixed points under an induced involution. Frenkel, Lepowsky, and Meurman conjectured in 1988 that $V^\natural$ is the unique holomorphic vertex operator algebra with central charge 24, and partition function $j(\tau) - 744$. This conjecture is still open.

=== Chiral de Rham complex ===
Malikov, Schechtman, and Vaintrob showed that by a method of localization, one may canonically attach a bcβγ (boson–fermion superfield) system to a smooth complex manifold. This complex of sheaves has a distinguished differential, and the global cohomology is a vertex superalgebra. Ben-Zvi, Heluani, and Szczesny showed that a Riemannian metric on the manifold induces an N=1 superconformal structure, which is promoted to an N=2 structure if the metric is Kähler and Ricci-flat, and a hyperkähler structure induces an N=4 structure. Borisov and Libgober showed that one may obtain the two-variable elliptic genus of a compact complex manifold from the cohomology of the Chiral de Rham complex. If the manifold is Calabi–Yau, then this genus is a weak Jacobi form.

=== Vertex algebra associated to a surface defect ===
A vertex algebra can arise as a subsector of higher dimensional quantum field theory which localizes to a two real-dimensional submanifold of the space on which the higher dimensional theory is defined. A prototypical example is the construction of Beem, Leemos, Liendo, Peelaers, Rastelli, and van Rees which associates a vertex algebra to any 4d N=2 superconformal field theory. This vertex algebra has the property that its character coincides with the Schur index of the 4d superconformal theory. When the theory admits a weak coupling limit, the vertex algebra has an explicit description as a BRST reduction of a bcβγ system.

== Vertex operator superalgebras ==
By allowing the underlying vector space to be a superspace (i.e., a Z/2Z-graded vector space $V=V_+\oplus V_-$) one can define a vertex superalgebra by the same data as a vertex algebra, with 1 in V_{+} and T an even operator. The axioms are essentially the same, but one must incorporate suitable signs into the locality axiom, or one of the equivalent formulations. That is, if a and b are homogeneous, one compares Y(a,z)Y(b,w) with εY(b,w)Y(a,z), where ε is –1 if both a and b are odd and 1 otherwise. If in addition there is a Virasoro element ω in the even part of V_{2}, and the usual grading restrictions are satisfied, then V is called a vertex operator superalgebra.

One of the simplest examples is the vertex operator superalgebra generated by a single free fermion ψ. As a Virasoro representation, it has central charge 1/2, and decomposes as a direct sum of Ising modules of lowest weight 0 and 1/2. One may also describe it as a spin representation of the Clifford algebra on the quadratic space t^{1/2}C[t,t^{−1}](dt)^{1/2} with residue pairing. The vertex operator superalgebra is holomorphic, in the sense that all modules are direct sums of itself, i.e., the module category is equivalent to the category of vector spaces.

The tensor square of the free fermion is called the free charged fermion, and by boson–fermion correspondence, it is isomorphic to the lattice vertex superalgebra attached to the odd lattice Z. This correspondence has been used by Date–Jimbo–Kashiwara-Miwa to construct soliton solutions to the KP hierarchy of nonlinear PDEs.

== Superconformal structures ==
The Virasoro algebra has some supersymmetric extensions that naturally appear in superconformal field theory and superstring theory. The N=1, 2, and 4 superconformal algebras are of particular importance.

Infinitesimal holomorphic superconformal transformations of a supercurve (with one even local coordinate z and N odd local coordinates θ_{1},...,θ_{N}) are generated by the coefficients of a super-stress–energy tensor T(z, θ_{1}, ..., θ_{N}).

When N=1, T has odd part given by a Virasoro field L(z), and even part given by a field

$$G(z) = \sum_n G_n z^{-n-3/2}$$

subject to commutation relations

- $[G_m,L_n] = (m-n/2)G_{m+n}$
- $[G_m,G_n] = (m-n)L_{m+n} + \delta_{m,-n} \frac{4m^2+1}{12}c$

By examining the symmetry of the operator products, one finds that there are two possibilities for the field G: the indices n are either all integers, yielding the Ramond algebra, or all half-integers, yielding the Neveu–Schwarz algebra. These algebras have unitary discrete series representations at central charge

$$\hat{c} = \frac{2}{3}c = 1-\frac{8}{m(m+2)} \quad m \geq 3$$

and unitary representations for all c greater than 3/2, with lowest weight h only constrained by h≥ 0 for Neveu–Schwarz and h ≥ c/24 for Ramond.

An N=1 superconformal vector in a vertex operator algebra V of central charge c is an odd element τ ∈ V of weight 3/2, such that

$$Y(\tau,z) = G(z) = \sum_{m \in \mathbb{Z}+1/2} G_n z^{-n-3/2},$$

G_{−1/2}τ = ω, and the coefficients of G(z) yield an action of the N=1 Neveu–Schwarz algebra at central charge c.

For N=2 supersymmetry, one obtains even fields L(z) and J(z), and odd fields G^{+}(z) and G^{−}(z). The field J(z) generates an action of the Heisenberg algebras (described by physicists as a U(1) current). There are both Ramond and Neveu–Schwarz N=2 superconformal algebras, depending on whether the indexing on the G fields is integral or half-integral. However, the U(1) current gives rise to a one-parameter family of isomorphic superconformal algebras interpolating between Ramond and Neveu–Schwartz, and this deformation of structure is known as spectral flow. The unitary representations are given by discrete series with central charge c = 3-6/m for integers m at least 3, and a continuum of lowest weights for c > 3.

An N=2 superconformal structure on a vertex operator algebra is a pair of odd elements τ^{+}, τ^{−} of weight 3/2, and an even element μ of weight 1 such that τ^{±} generate G^{±}(z), and μ generates J(z).

For N=3 and 4, unitary representations only have central charges in a discrete family, with c=3k/2 and 6k, respectively, as k ranges over positive integers.

== Additional constructions ==
- Fixed point subalgebras: Given an action of a symmetry group on a vertex operator algebra, the subalgebra of fixed vectors is also a vertex operator algebra. In 2013, Miyamoto proved that two important finiteness properties, namely Zhu's condition C_{2} and regularity, are preserved when taking fixed points under finite solvable group actions.
- Current extensions: Given a vertex operator algebra and some modules of integral conformal weight, one may under favorable circumstances describe a vertex operator algebra structure on the direct sum. Lattice vertex algebras are a standard example of this. Another family of examples are framed VOAs, which start with tensor products of Ising models, and add modules that correspond to suitably even codes.
- Orbifolds: Given a finite cyclic group acting on a holomorphic VOA, it is conjectured that one may construct a second holomorphic VOA by adjoining irreducible twisted modules and taking fixed points under an induced automorphism, as long as those twisted modules have suitable conformal weight. This is known to be true in special cases, e.g., groups of order at most 3 acting on lattice VOAs.
- The coset construction (due to Goddard, Kent, and Olive): Given a vertex operator algebra V of central charge c and a set S of vectors, one may define the commutant C(V,S) to be the subspace of vectors v strictly commute with all fields coming from S, i.e., such that Y(s,z)v ∈ V[[z]] for all s ∈ S. This turns out to be a vertex subalgebra, with Y, T, and identity inherited from V. And if S is a VOA of central charge c_{S}, the commutant is a VOA of central charge c–c_{S}. For example, the embedding of SU(2) at level k+1 into the tensor product of two SU(2) algebras at levels k and 1 yields the Virasoro discrete series with p=k+2, q=k+3, and this was used to prove their existence in the 1980s. Again with SU(2), the embedding of level k+2 into the tensor product of level k and level 2 yields the N=1 superconformal discrete series.
- BRST reduction: For any degree 1 vector v satisfying v_{0}^{2}=0, the cohomology of this operator has a graded vertex superalgebra structure. More generally, one may use any weight 1 field whose residue has square zero. The usual method is to tensor with fermions, as one then has a canonical differential. An important special case is quantum Drinfeld–Sokolov reduction applied to affine Kac–Moody algebras to obtain affine W-algebras as degree 0 cohomology. These W algebras also admit constructions as vertex subalgebras of free bosons given by kernels of screening operators.

== Related algebraic structures ==
- If one considers only the singular part of the OPE in a vertex algebra, one arrives at the definition of a Lie conformal algebra. Since one is often only concerned with the singular part of the OPE, this makes Lie conformal algebras a natural object to study. There is a functor from vertex algebras to Lie conformal algebras that forgets the regular part of OPEs, and it has a left adjoint, called the "universal vertex algebra" functor. Vacuum modules of affine Kac–Moody algebras and Virasoro vertex algebras are universal vertex algebras, and in particular, they can be described very concisely once the background theory is developed.
- There are several generalizations of the notion of vertex algebra in the literature. Some mild generalizations involve a weakening of the locality axiom to allow monodromy, e.g., the abelian intertwining algebras of Dong and Lepowsky. One may view these roughly as vertex algebra objects in a braided tensor category of graded vector spaces, in much the same way that a vertex superalgebra is such an object in the category of super vector spaces. More complicated generalizations relate to q-deformations and representations of quantum groups, such as in work of Frenkel–Reshetikhin, Etingof–Kazhdan, and Li.
- Beilinson and Drinfeld introduced a sheaf-theoretic notion of chiral algebra that is closely related to the notion of vertex algebra, but is defined without using any visible power series. Given an algebraic curve X, a chiral algebra on X is a D_{X}-module A equipped with a multiplication operation $j_*j^*(A \boxtimes A) \to \Delta_* A$ on X×X that satisfies an associativity condition. They also introduced an equivalent notion of factorization algebra that is a system of quasicoherent sheaves on all finite products of the curve, together with a compatibility condition involving pullbacks to the complement of various diagonals. Any translation-equivariant chiral algebra on the affine line can be identified with a vertex algebra by taking the fiber at a point, and there is a natural way to attach a chiral algebra on a smooth algebraic curve to any vertex operator algebra.

== See also ==
- Operator algebra
- Zhu algebra

== Sources ==
- Borcherds, Richard (1986), "Vertex algebras, Kac-Moody algebras, and the Monster", Proceedings of the National Academy of Sciences of the United States of America, 83 (10): 3068–3071, Bibcode:1986PNAS...83.3068B, doi:10.1073/pnas.83.10.3068, PMC 323452, PMID 16593694
- Borisov, Lev A.; Libgober, Anatoly (2000), "Elliptic genera of toric varieties and applications to mirror symmetry", Inventiones Mathematicae, 140 (2): 453–485, arXiv:math/9904126, Bibcode:2000InMat.140..453B, doi:10.1007/s002220000058, MR 1757003, S2CID 8427026
- Frenkel, Edward; Ben-Zvi, David (2001), Vertex algebras and Algebraic Curves, Mathematical Surveys and Monographs, American Mathematical Society, ISBN 0-8218-2894-0
- Frenkel, Igor; Lepowsky, James; Meurman, Arne (1988), Vertex operator algebras and the Monster, Pure and Applied Mathematics, vol. 134, Academic Press, ISBN 0-12-267065-5
- Kac, Victor (1998), Vertex algebras for beginners, University Lecture Series, vol. 10 (2nd ed.), American Mathematical Society, ISBN 0-8218-1396-X
- Wang, Weiqiang (1993), "Rationality of Virasoro vertex operator algebras", International Mathematics Research Notices, 1993 (7): 197, doi:10.1155/S1073792893000212
- Xu, Xiaoping (1998), Introduction to vertex operator superalgebras and their modules, Springer, ISBN 079235242-4
