= Chiral algebra =

In mathematics, a chiral algebra is an algebraic structure introduced by Beilinson and Drinfeld (2004) as a rigorous version of the rather vague concept of a chiral algebra in physics. In Chiral Algebras, Beilinson and Drinfeld introduced the notion of chiral algebra, which based on the pseudo-tensor category of D-modules. They give a 'coordinate independent' notion of vertex algebras, which are based on formal power series. Chiral algebras on curves are essentially conformal vertex algebras.

== Definition ==
A chiral algebra on a smooth algebraic curve $X$ is a right D-module $\mathcal{A}$, equipped with a D-module homomorphism
$$\mu : \mathcal{A} \boxtimes \mathcal{A}(\infty \Delta) \rightarrow \Delta_! \mathcal{A}$$
on $X^2$ and with an embedding $\Omega \hookrightarrow \mathcal{A}$, satisfying the following conditions

- $\mu = -\sigma_{12} \circ \mu \circ \sigma_{12}$ (Skew-symmetry)
- $\mu_{1\{23\}} = \mu_{\{12\}3} + \mu_{2\{13\}}$ (Jacobi identity)
- The unit map is compatible with the homomorphism $\mu_\Omega: \Omega \boxtimes \Omega (\infty \Delta) \rightarrow \Delta_!\Omega$; that is, the following diagram commutes

$$\begin{array}{lcl}
& \Omega \boxtimes \mathcal{A}(\infty\Delta) & \rightarrow & \mathcal{A} \boxtimes \mathcal{A}(\infty \Delta) & \\
& \downarrow && \downarrow \\
& \Delta_!\mathcal A & \rightarrow & \Delta_! \mathcal A & \\
\end{array}$$
Where, for sheaves $\mathcal{M}, \mathcal{N}$ on $X$, the sheaf $\mathcal{M}\boxtimes\mathcal{N}(\infty \Delta)$ is the sheaf on $X^2$ whose sections are sections of the external tensor product $\mathcal{M}\boxtimes\mathcal{N}$ with arbitrary poles on the diagonal:
$$\mathcal M \boxtimes \mathcal N (\infty \Delta) = \varinjlim \mathcal{M} \boxtimes \mathcal{N} (n \Delta),$$
$\Omega$ is the canonical bundle, and the 'diagonal extension by delta-functions' $\Delta_!$ is
$$\Delta_!\mathcal{M} = \frac{\Omega \boxtimes \mathcal{M}(\infty \Delta)}{\Omega \boxtimes \mathcal{M}}.$$

== Relation to other algebras ==
=== Vertex algebra ===
The category of vertex algebras as defined by Borcherds or Kac is equivalent to the category of chiral algebras on $X = \mathbb{A}^1$ equivariant with respect to the group $T$ of translations.

=== Factorization algebra ===
Chiral algebras can also be reformulated as factorization algebras.

== See also ==
- Chiral homology
- Chiral Lie algebra
