= Beilinson regulator =

Map from algebraic K-theory to cohomology

In mathematics, especially in algebraic geometry, the Beilinson regulator is the Chern class map from algebraic K-theory to Deligne cohomology:

$$K_n (X) \rightarrow \oplus_{p \geq 0} H_D^{2p-n} (X, \mathbf Q(p)).$$

Here, X is a complex smooth projective variety, for example. It is named after Alexander Beilinson. The Beilinson regulator features in Beilinson's conjecture on special values of L-functions.

The Dirichlet regulator map (used in the proof of Dirichlet's unit theorem) for the ring of integers $\mathcal O_F$ of a number field F

$$\mathcal O_F^\times \rightarrow \mathbf R^{r_1 + r_2}, \ \ x \mapsto (\log |\sigma (x)|)_\sigma$$

is a particular case of the Beilinson regulator. (As usual, $\sigma: F \hookrightarrow \mathbf C$ runs over all complex embeddings of F, where conjugate embeddings are considered equivalent.) Up to a factor 2, the Beilinson regulator is also generalization of the Borel regulator.
