= Special values of L-functions =

Subfield of number theory

In mathematics, the study of special values of L-functions is a subfield of number theory devoted to generalising formulae such as the Leibniz formula for π, namely
$$1 \,-\, \frac{1}{3} \,+\, \frac{1}{5} \,-\, \frac{1}{7} \,+\, \frac{1}{9} \,-\, \cdots \;=\; \frac{\pi}{4},\!$$

by the recognition that expression on the left-hand side is equal to $L(1)$ where $L(s)$ is the Dirichlet L-function for the field of Gaussian rational numbers. The right-hand side then follows from the analytic class number formula, and the factor $\tfrac14$ appears because the Gaussian field has class number 1 and contains four roots of unity.

== Conjectures ==
There are two families of conjectures, formulated for general classes of L-functions (the very general setting being for L-functions associated to Chow motives over number fields), the division into two reflecting the questions of:

1. how to replace $\pi$ in the Leibniz formula by some other "transcendental" number (regardless of whether it is currently possible for transcendental number theory to provide a proof of the transcendence); and
2. how to generalise the rational factor in the formula (class number divided by number of roots of unity) by some algebraic construction of a rational number that will represent the ratio of the L-function value to the "transcendental" factor.

Subsidiary explanations are given for the integer values of $n$ for which formulae of this sort involving $L(n)$ can be expected to hold.

The conjectures for (a) are called Beilinson's conjectures, for Alexander Beilinson. The idea is to abstract from the regulator of a number field to some "higher regulator" (the Beilinson regulator), a determinant constructed on a real vector space that comes from algebraic K-theory.

The conjectures for (b) are called the Bloch–Kato conjectures for special values (for Spencer Bloch and Kazuya Kato; this circle of ideas is distinct from the Bloch–Kato conjecture of K-theory, extending the Milnor conjecture, a proof of which was announced in 2009). They are also called the Tamagawa number conjecture, a name arising via the Birch–Swinnerton-Dyer conjecture and its formulation as an elliptic curve analogue of the Tamagawa number problem for linear algebraic groups. In a further extension, the equivariant Tamagawa number conjecture (ETNC) has been formulated, to consolidate the connection of these ideas with Iwasawa theory, and its so-called Main Conjecture.

=== Current status ===
All of these conjectures are known to be true only in special cases.

== See also ==
- Brumer–Stark conjecture
