= Lie-* algebra =

In mathematics, a Lie-* algebra is a D-module with a Lie* bracket. They were introduced by Alexander Beilinson and Vladimir Drinfeld, and are similar to the conformal algebras discussed by Kac (1998) and to vertex Lie algebras.
