= Theorem of absolute purity =

Mathematical theorem

In algebraic geometry, the theorem of absolute (cohomological) purity is an important theorem in the theory of étale cohomology. It states: given

- a regular scheme X over some base scheme,
- $i: Z \to X$ a closed immersion of a regular scheme of pure codimension r,
- an integer n that is invertible on the base scheme,
- $\mathcal{F}$ a locally constant étale sheaf with finite stalks and values in $\mathbb{Z}/n\mathbb{Z}$,

for each integer $m \ge 0$, the map

$$\operatorname{H}^m(Z_{\text{ét}}; \mathcal{F}) \to \operatorname{H}^{m+2r}_Z(X_{\text{ét}}; \mathcal{F}(r))$$

is bijective, where the map is induced by cup product with $c_r(Z)$.

The theorem was introduced in SGA 5 Exposé I, § 3.1.4. as an open problem. Later, Thomason proved it for large n and Gabber in general.

== See also ==
- purity (algebraic geometry)
