= Manin–Drinfeld theorem =

The difference of two cusps of a modular curve has finite order in the Jacobian variety

In mathematics, the Manin–Drinfeld theorem, proved by Manin (1972) and Drinfeld (1973), states that the difference of two cusps of a modular curve has finite order in the Jacobian variety.
