= Mikhail Kravchuk =

Ukrainian mathematician

Mikhailo P. Kravchuk
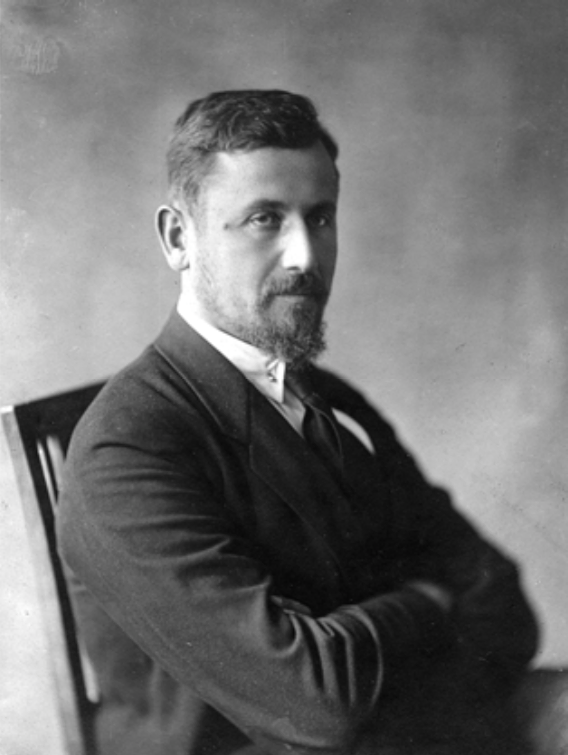
- Born: September 27, 1892; Chovnitsy, Volyn Governorate (present-day Ukraine)
- Died: March 9, 1942 (aged 49); Kolyma, Soviet Union
- Education: Kyiv University
- Known for: Kravchuk polynomials, Kravchuk matrix
- Scientific career
- Fields: Mathematician
- Workplaces: Kyiv Polytechnic Institute
- Doctoral advisor: Dmitry Grave
- Doctoral students: Sergey Korolev; Vladimir Chelomei

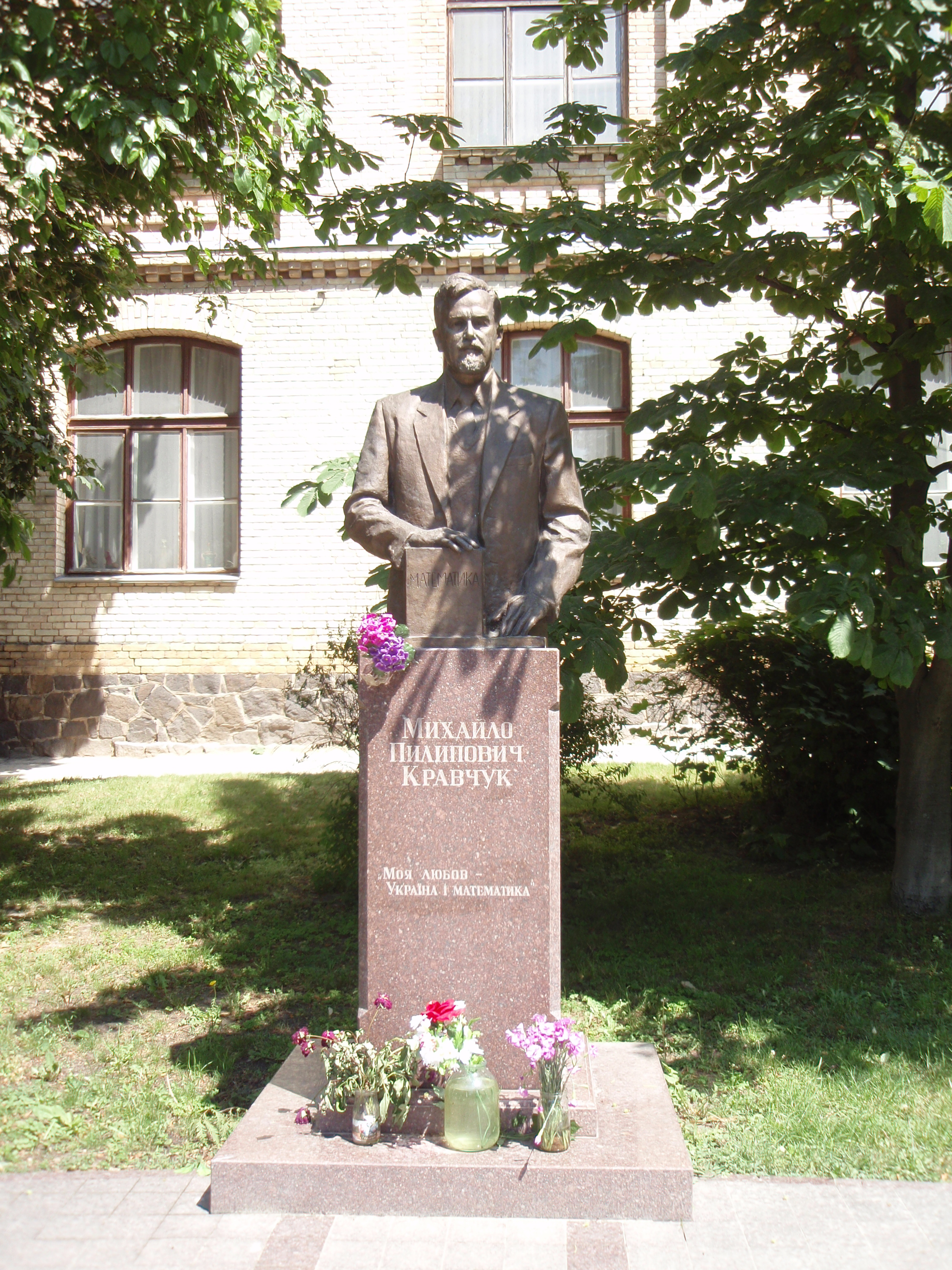
Monument to Mykhailo Kravchuk at KPI

Mykhailo Pylypovych Kravchuk, also Krawtchouk (Ukrainian: Миха́йло Пили́пович Кравчу́к) (September 27, 1892 – March 9, 1942), was a Ukrainian mathematician and the author of around 180 articles on mathematics.

He primarily wrote papers on differential equations and integral equations, studying both their theory and applications. His two-volume monograph on the solution of linear differential and integral equations by the method of moments was translated c. 1938–1942 by John Vincent Atanasoff who found this work useful in his computer project (Atanasoff–Berry computer). His student Klavdiya Latysheva was the first Ukrainian woman to obtain a doctorate in the mathematical and physical sciences (1936).

Kravchuk held a mathematics chair at the Kyiv Polytechnic Institute. His course listeners included Sergey Korolev, Arkhip Lyulka, and Vladimir Chelomei, future leading rocket and jet engine designers. Kravchuk was arrested by the Soviet secret police on February 23, 1938 on political and spying charges. He was sentenced to 20 years of prison in September 1938. Kravchuk died in a Gulag camp in the Kolyma region on March 9, 1942. In September 1956 Kravchuk was posthumously acquitted of all charges.

He was restored as a member of the National Academy of Sciences of Ukraine posthumously in 1992. He is the eponym of the Kravchuk polynomials and Kravchuk matrix.
