= Discrete Chebyshev polynomials =

Type of discrete orthogonal polynomials

In mathematics, discrete Chebyshev polynomials, or Gram polynomials, are a type of discrete orthogonal polynomials used in approximation theory, introduced by Pafnuty Chebyshev and rediscovered by Gram. They were later found to be applicable to various algebraic properties of spin angular momentum. This connection shows that they can be expressed as Clebsch-Gordan coefficients.

== Elementary definition ==
The discrete Chebyshev polynomial $t^N_n(x)$ is a polynomial of degree n in x, for $n = 0, 1, 2,\ldots, N -1$, constructed such that two polynomials of unequal degree are orthogonal with respect to the weight function
$$w(x) = \sum_{r = 0}^{N-1} \delta(x-r),$$
with $\delta(\cdot)$ being the Dirac delta function. That is,
$$\int_{-\infty}^{\infty} t^N_n(x) t^N_m (x) w(x) \, dx = 0 \quad \text{ if } \quad n \ne m .$$

The integral on the left is actually a sum because of the delta function, and we have,
$$\sum_{r = 0}^{N-1} t^N_n(r) t^N_m (r) = 0 \quad \text{ if }\quad n \ne m.$$

Thus, even though $t^N_n(x)$ is a polynomial in $x$, only its values at a discrete set of points, $x = 0, 1, 2, \ldots, N-1$ are of any significance. Nevertheless, because these polynomials can be defined in terms of orthogonality with respect to a nonnegative weight function, the entire theory of orthogonal polynomials is applicable. In particular, the polynomials are complete in the sense that
$$\sum_{n = 0}^{N-1} t^N_n(r) t^N_n (s) = 0 \quad \text{ if }\quad r \ne s.$$

Chebyshev chose the normalization so that
$$\sum_{r = 0}^{N-1} t^N_n(r) t^N_n (r) = \frac{N}{2n+1} \prod_{k=1}^n (N^2 - k^2).$$

This fixes the polynomials completely along with the sign convention, $t^N_n(N - 1) > 0$.

If the independent variable is linearly scaled and shifted so that the end points assume the values $-1$ and $1$, then as $N \to \infty$, $t^N_n(\cdot) \to P_n(\cdot)$ times a constant, where $P_n$ is the Legendre polynomial.

== Advanced definition ==
Let f be a smooth function defined on the closed interval [−1, 1], whose values are known explicitly only at points x_{k} := −1 + (2k − 1)/m, where k and m are integers and 1 ≤ k ≤ m. The task is to approximate f as a polynomial of degree n < m. Consider a positive semi-definite bilinear form
$$\left(g,h\right)_d:=\frac{1}{m}\sum_{k=1}^{m}{g(x_k)h(x_k)},$$
where g and h are continuous on [−1, 1] and let
$$\left\|g\right\|_d:=(g,g)^{1/2}_{d}$$
be a discrete semi-norm. Let $\varphi_k$ be a family of polynomials orthogonal to each other
$$\left( \varphi_k, \varphi_i\right)_d = 0$$
whenever i is not equal to k. Assume all the polynomials $\varphi_k$ have a positive leading coefficient and they are normalized in such a way that
$$\left\|\varphi_k\right\|_d=1.$$

The $\varphi_k$ are called discrete Chebyshev (or Gram) polynomials.

== Connection with spin algebra ==
The discrete Chebyshev polynomials have surprising connections to various algebraic properties of spin: spin transition probabilities, the probabilities for observations of the spin in Bohm's spin-s version of the Einstein-Podolsky-Rosen experiment, and Wigner functions for various spin states.

Specifically, the polynomials turn out to be the eigenvectors of the absolute square of the rotation matrix (the Wigner D-matrix). The associated eigenvalue is the Legendre polynomial $P_{\ell}(\cos \theta)$, where $\theta$ is the rotation angle. In other words, if
$$d_{mm'} = \langle j,m|e^{-i\theta J_y}|j,m'\rangle,$$
where $|j,m\rangle$ are the usual angular momentum or spin eigenstates, and
$$F_{mm'}(\theta) = |d_{mm'}(\theta)|^2 ,$$
then
$$\sum_{m' = -j}^j F_{mm'}(\theta)\, f^j_{\ell}(m')= P_{\ell}(\cos\theta) f^j_{\ell}(m) .$$

The eigenvectors $f^j_{\ell}(m)$ are scaled and shifted versions of the Chebyshev polynomials. They are shifted so as to have support on the points $m = -j, -j + 1, \ldots, j$ instead of $r = 0, 1, \ldots, N$ for $t^N_n(r)$ with $N$ corresponding to $2j+1$, and $n$ corresponding to $\ell$. In addition, the $f^j_{\ell}(m)$ can be scaled so as to obey other normalization conditions. For example, one could demand that they satisfy
$$\frac{1}{2j+1} \sum_{m=-j}^{j} f^j_{\ell}(m) f^j_{\ell'}(m) = \delta_{\ell\ell'},$$
along with $f^j_{\ell}(j) > 0$.

== Connection with Clebsch-Gordan coefficients ==
In the form, $f^j_{\ell}(m)$, the connection with spin algebra shows that these polynomials are Clebsch-Gordan coefficients. To be consistent with the normalization given above, the relation is

$$f^j_{\ell}(m) = (-1)^{j - m} \sqrt{2j+1} \langle{j\,j\,\ell\,0|j,m; j,-m}\rangle.$$
