= Factorization homology =

In algebraic topology and category theory, factorization homology is a variant of topological chiral homology, motivated by an application to topological quantum field theory and cobordism hypothesis in particular. It was introduced by David Ayala, John Francis, and Nick Rozenblyum.
