= Chiral Lie algebra =

In algebra, a chiral Lie algebra is a D-module on a curve with a certain structure of Lie algebra. It is related to an $\mathcal{E}_2$-algebra via the Riemann–Hilbert correspondence.

== See also ==
- Chiral algebra
- Chiral homology
