= Formal distribution =

Infinite sum of positive and negative powers of a formal variable

In mathematics, a formal distribution is an infinite sum of powers of a formal variable, usually denoted $z$ in the theory of formal distributions. The coefficients of these infinite sums can be many different mathematical structures, such as vector spaces or rings, but in applications most often take values in an algebra over a field. These infinite sums are allowed to have infinitely many positive and negative powers, and are not required to converge, and so do not define functions of the formal variable. Rather, they are interpreted as distributions, that is, linear functionals on an appropriate space of test functions. They are closely related to formal Laurent series, but are not required to have finitely many negative powers. In particular, this means even if the coefficients are ring-valued, it is not necessarily possible to multiply two formal distributions.

They are important in the study of vertex operator algebras, since the vertex operator playing a central role in the theory takes values in a space of endomorphism-valued formal distributions.

== Definition over a "C"-algebra ==
Let $R$ be an algebra over $\mathbb{C}$, as is the case for applications to vertex algebras. An $R$-valued formal distribution in $n$ variables $z_1, \cdots, z_n$ is an arbitrary series
$$A(z_1, \cdots, z_n) = \sum_{i_1 \in \mathbb{Z}}\cdots \sum_{i_n \in \mathbb{Z}} A_{i_1, \cdots, i_n}z_1^{i_1}\cdots z_n^{i_n},$$
with each $A_{i_1, \cdots, i_n} \in R$. These series form a vector space, denoted $R[[z_1, z_1^{-1}, \cdots, z_n, z_n^{-1}]]$. While it can be possible to multiply some pairs of elements in the space of formal distributions, in general there is no product on the whole space.

In practice, the number of variables considered is often just one or two.

=== Products ===
If the variables in two formal distributions are disjoint, then the product is well-defined.

The product of a formal distribution by a Laurent polynomial is also well-defined.

== Formal distributions in a single variable ==
For this section we consider $R[[z, z^{-1}]]$.

=== Formal residue ===
The formal residue is a linear map $\operatorname{Res}: R[[z, z^{-1}]] \rightarrow R$, given by
$$\operatorname{Res}f(z) = \operatorname{Res}\sum_{n \in \mathbb{Z}} f_n z^n = f_{-1}.$$
The formal residue of $f(z)$ can also be written $\operatorname{Res}_z f(z), \operatorname{Res}_{z = 0}f(z)$ or $\operatorname{Res}f(z)dz$. It is named after residues from complex analysis, and when $f(z)$ is a meromorphic function on a neighborhood of zero in the complex plane, the two notions coincide.

=== Formal derivative ===
The formal derivative is a linear map $\partial_z: R[[z, z^{-1}]] \rightarrow R[[z, z^{-1}]]$. For an element $a z^n$, its action is given by
$$a z^n \mapsto \partial_z a z^n = n a z^{n-1},$$
extended linearly to give a map for the whole space.

In particular, for any formal distribution $f(z)$,
$$\operatorname{Res} \partial_z f(z) = 0$$

=== Interpretation as distribution ===
This then motivates why they are named distributions: considering the space of 'test functions' to be the space of Laurent polynomials, any formal distribution defines a linear functional on the test functions. If $\varphi \in \mathbb{C}[z, z^{-1}]$ is a Laurent polynomial, the formal distribution $f \in \mathbb{C}[[z, z^{-1}]]$ defines a linear functional by
$$\varphi \mapsto \langle f, \varphi \rangle := \operatorname{Res}f(z)\varphi(z).$$

== Formal distributions in two variables ==
For this section we consider $R[[z, z^{-1}, w, w^{-1}]]$.

=== Delta distribution ===
One of the most important distributions is the delta function, and indeed it can be realized as a formal distribution in two variables.

It is defined
$$\delta(z - w) := \sum_{n \in \mathbb{Z}}z^{-n-1} w^n = \frac{1}{z} \sum_{n \in \mathbb{Z}}\left(\frac{w}{z}\right)^n,$$
and satisfies, for any formal distribution $f(z)$
$$\langle \delta(z - w), f(z) \rangle = \operatorname{Res}_z \delta(z-w) f(z) = f(w),$$
where now, the subscript $z$ on $\operatorname{Res}_z$ is necessary to identify for which variable one reads the residue from.

==== Expansions of zero ====
A subtle point which enters for formal distributions in two variables is that there are expressions which naïvely vanish but in fact are non-zero in the space of distributions.

Consider the expression $(z - w)^{-1}$, considered as a function in two complex variables. When $|z| > |w|$, this has the series expansion $(z - w)^{-1}_+ := -\frac{1}{z} \sum_{n > 0}\left(\frac{z}{w}\right)^n$, while for $|z| < |w|$, it has the series expansion $(z - w)^{-1}_+ := \frac{1}{z} \sum_{n \geq 0}\left(\frac{w}{z}\right)^n$.

Then
$$0 = (z - w)^{-1} - (z - w)^{-1} \overset{?}= (z - w)^{-1}_+ - (z - w)^{-1}_- = \frac{1}{z} \sum_{n \in \mathbb{Z}}\left(\frac{w}{z}\right)^n = \delta(z - w).$$

So the equality does not hold.

== See also ==
- Formal power series
- Vertex operator algebra
