= Drinfeld upper half plane =

In mathematics, the Drinfeld upper half plane is a rigid analytic space analogous to the usual upper half plane for function fields, introduced by Drinfeld (1976). It is defined to be the set difference P^{1}(C) \ P^{1}(F_{∞}), where F is a function field of a curve over a finite field, F_{∞} its completion at ∞, and C the completion of the algebraic closure of F_{∞}.

The analogy with the usual upper half plane arises from the fact that the global function field F is analogous to the rational numbers Q. Then, F_{∞} is the real numbers R and the algebraic closure of F_{∞} is the complex numbers C (which are already complete). Finally, P^{1}(C) is the Riemann sphere, so P^{1}(C) \ P^{1}(R) is the upper half plane together with the lower half plane.
