= Klavdiya Latysheva =

Soviet mathematician

- Born: March 14, 1897
- Died: May 11, 1956 (aged 59)
- Resting place: Lukyanivka cemetery, Kyiv
- Citizenship: Soviet
- Education: Mykhailo Drahomanov University
- Known for: Frobenius-Latysheva method
- Scientific career
- Fields: Differential equations
- Thesis: Наближене розв'язування за допомогою способу моментів лінійних, диференціальних рівнянь, що мають особливості в коефіцієнтах (1936)
- Doctoral advisor: Mykhailo Kravchuk

Klavdiya Yakovlevna Latysheva (Russian: Клавдия Яковлевна Латышева; Ukrainian: Клавдія Яківна Латишева; born 14 March 1897, Kyiv, Russian Empire – 11 May 1956, Kyiv, Ukrainian SSR, Soviet Union (now Kyiv, Ukraine)) was a Soviet mathematician known for her contributions to the theory of differential equations, electrodynamics and probability. She was honoured with the Order of Lenin and the Medal "For Valiant Labour in the Great Patriotic War 1941–1945".

== Life ==
Klavdiya Yakovlevna Latysheva was born in Kyiv, Russian Empire (now Kyiv, Ukraine) on 14 March 1897 in a Russian military family. She completed her high school in 1916, and obtained a degree from the Physico-Mathematical division of the Kyiv higher women's educational institution in 1921. The rest of her education and career was at the Mykhailo Drahomanov University. Her teachers were Boris Bukreev, Dmitry Grave, and Georgy Pfeiffer. From 1925 to 1928, she was in postgraduate studies, working on finding solutions to differential and integral equations using Mykhailo Kravchuk's method of moments. Kravchuk was her doctoral adviser. She was the first Ukrainian woman to obtain a doctorate in the mathematical and physical sciences, with her dissertation on approximate solutions of linear differential equations with singular coefficients (1936).

Latysheva was an organiser of the first All-Ukrainian Mathematical Olympiad in 1936.

During the Second World War, Latysheva transferred to Saratov. She worked at the automotive and highway faculty of the Saratov State Technical University.

In 1946, she established a scientific group in the Faculty of Mechanics and Mathematics of the Taras Shevchenko University to study the analytical theory of differential equations. Between 1953 and 1956, Latysheva headed this group. She was the dean of the Faculty between 1952 and 1954.

For her contributions to mathematics, she was awarded the Order of Lenin in 1954, as well as the Medal "For Valiant Labour in the Great Patriotic War 1941–1945".

Latysheva died on 11 May 1956, and was interred in the Lukyanivka cemetery in Kyiv.

== Scientific work ==
Latysheva developed an effective method for the construction of solutions of linear ordinary differential equations around regular and irregular points by expanding on Poincaré's concept of rank and L. Tome's concept of anti-rank. This is now known as the Frobenius-Latysheva method. As part of this work, she determined a new type of normal and normal-regular solutions, and provided necessary and sufficient conditions for their existence. This was a major contribution, providing for the existence of closed-form solutions of linear differential equations with polynomial coefficients. A series of twelve articles, published between 1946–1952, established the full results, and also simplified and extended related theorems in the analytic theory of differential equations by Poincaré, Cayley and others.

== Selected publications ==
- «Математический задачник для химических институтов» (1932)
- «Элементы приближённых вычислений» (1942)
- Нормально-регулярные решения и их приложения. Kyiv: Vyshcha Shkola. 1974. (with N.I. Tereshchenko and G.S. Oryol)
- Lectures on the Analytical Theory of Differential Equations and their Applications (Frobenius-Latysheva method) (in Russian). Kyiv: Inst. Mat. Akad. Nauk Ukr. SSR. 1970. (with N.I. Tereshchenko)
- "On the works of V. P. Yermakov on the theory of differential equations". Istoriko-Matematicheskie Issledovaniya. 9. 1956.
- "Normal solutions of linear differential equations with polynomial coefficients". Uspekhi Mat. Nauk. 8 (5(57)). 1953.
- "On the Gauss law of distribution for functions of two variables". J. Inst. Matematiki AN Ukr. SSR. 2. 1934.

== Bibliography ==
- Borodin, A.I. (1967). "Математический календарь на 1966/67 учебный год". Математика в школе (1).
- Borodin, A.I. (1972). "Математический календарь на 1971/72 учебный год". Математика в школе (1).
- "History of the department". Department of Integral and Differential Equations, University of Kyiv. Archived from the original on 2019-10-21.
- Dobrovolsky, V.O (2016). "ЛА́ТИШЕВА Клавдія Яківна". Encyclopedia of Modern Ukraine.
- Tasmambetov, Z.N. (2011). Конференциялар тағылымы (PDF). Aktobe. Archived from the original (PDF) on 2019-10-25.
