= Zhu algebra =

Invariant of vertex algebra

In mathematics, the Zhu algebra and the closely related C_{2}-algebra, introduced by Yongchang Zhu in his PhD thesis, are two associative algebras canonically constructed from a given vertex operator algebra. Many important representation theoretic properties of the vertex algebra are logically related to properties of its Zhu algebra or C_{2}-algebra.

== Definitions ==
Let $V = \bigoplus_{n \ge 0} V_{(n)}$ be a graded vertex operator algebra with $V_{(0)} = \mathbb{C}\mathbf{1}$ and let $Y(a, z) = \sum_{n \in \Z} a_n z^{-n-1}$ be the vertex operator associated to $a \in V$. Define $C_2(V)\subset V$ to be the subspace spanned by elements of the form $a_{-2} b$ for $a,b \in V$. An element $a \in V$ is homogeneous with $\operatorname{wt} a = n$ if $a \in V_{(n)}$. There are two binary operations on $V$ defined by
$$a * b = \sum_{i \ge 0} \binom{\operatorname{wt} a}{i} a_{i-1}b$$,
$$a \circ b = \sum_{i \ge 0} \binom{\operatorname{wt}a}{i} a_{i-2} b$$
for homogeneous elements and extended linearly to all of $V$. Define $O(V)\subset V$ to be the span of all elements $a\circ b$.

The algebra $A(V) := V/O(V)$ with the binary operation induced by $*$ is an associative algebra called the Zhu algebra of $V$.

The algebra $R_V := V/C_2(V)$ with multiplication $a\cdot b = a_{-1}b \mod C_2(V)$ is called the C_{2}-algebra of $V$.

== Main properties ==
- The multiplication of the C_{2}-algebra is commutative and the additional binary operation $\{a,b\} = a_{0}b\mod C_2(V)$ is a Poisson bracket on $R_V$which gives the C_{2}-algebra the structure of a Poisson algebra.
- (Zhu's C_{2}-cofiniteness condition) If $R_V$is finite dimensional then $V$ is said to be C_{2}-cofinite. There are two main representation theoretic properties related to C_{2}-cofiniteness. A vertex operator algebra $V$ is rational if the category of admissible modules is semisimple and there are only finitely many irreducibles. It was conjectured that rationality is equivalent to C_{2}-cofiniteness and a stronger condition regularity, however this was disproved in 2007 by Adamovic and Milas who showed that the triplet vertex operator algebra is C_{2}-cofinite but not rational. Various weaker versions of this conjecture are known, including that regularity implies C_{2}-cofiniteness and that for C_{2}-cofinite $V$ the conditions of rationality and regularity are equivalent. This conjecture is a vertex algebras analogue of Cartan's criterion for semisimplicity in the theory of Lie algebras because it relates a structural property of the algebra to the semisimplicity of its representation category.
- The grading on $V$ induces a filtration $A(V) = \bigcup_{p \ge 0} A_p(V)$ where $A_p(V) = \operatorname{im}(\oplus_{j = 0}^p V_p\to A(V))$ so that $A_p(V) \ast A_q(V) \subset A_{p+q}(V).$ There is a surjective morphism of Poisson algebras $R_V \to \operatorname{gr}(A(V))$.

== Associated variety ==
Because the C_{2}-algebra $R_V$ is a commutative algebra it may be studied using the language of algebraic geometry. The associated scheme $\widetilde{X}_V$ and associated variety $X_V$ of $V$ are defined to be
$$\widetilde{X}_V := \operatorname{Spec}(R_V)$$,
$$X_V := (\widetilde{X}_V)_{\mathrm{red}}$$
which are an affine scheme and an affine algebraic variety respectively. Moreover, since $L(-1)$ acts as a derivation on $R_V$ there is an action of $\mathbb{C}^\ast$ on the associated scheme making $\widetilde{X}_V$ a conical Poisson scheme and $X_V$ a conical Poisson variety. In this language, C_{2}-cofiniteness is equivalent to the property that $X_V$ is a point.

Example: If $W^k(\widehat{\mathfrak g}, f)$ is the affine W-algebra associated to affine Lie algebra $\widehat{\mathfrak g}$ at level $k$ and nilpotent element $f$ then $\widetilde{X}_{W^k(\widehat{\mathfrak g}, f)} = \mathcal{S}_f$is the Slodowy slice through $f$.
