= Drinfeld reciprocity =

In mathematics, Drinfeld reciprocity, introduced by Drinfeld (1974), is a correspondence between eigenforms of the moduli space of Drinfeld modules and factors of the corresponding Jacobian variety, such that all twisted L-functions are the same.
