= Drinfeld–Sokolov–Wilson equation =

The Drinfeld–Sokolov–Wilson (DSW) equations are an integrable system of two coupled nonlinear partial differential equations proposed by Vladimir Drinfeld and Vladimir Sokolov, and independently by George Wilson:

$$\begin{align}
&\frac{\partial u}{\partial t}+3v\frac{\partial v}{\partial x}=0\\[5pt]
&\frac{\partial v}{\partial t}=2\frac{\partial^3 v}{\partial x^3}+\frac{\partial u}{\partial x} v+2u \frac{\partial v}{\partial x}
\end{align}$$
