= Arithmetic variety =

In mathematics, an arithmetic variety is the quotient space of a Hermitian symmetric space by an arithmetic subgroup of the associated algebraic Lie group.

== Kazhdan's theorem ==
Kazhdan's theorem says the following:

Kazhdan's theorem—If X is an arithmetic variety, then, for all automorphisms σ of the complex numbers, σX is also an arithmetic variety.

== See also ==
- Arithmetic Chow groups
- Arithmetic of abelian varieties
- Abelian variety
