= Anatoly Libgober =

Russian/American mathematician (born 1949)

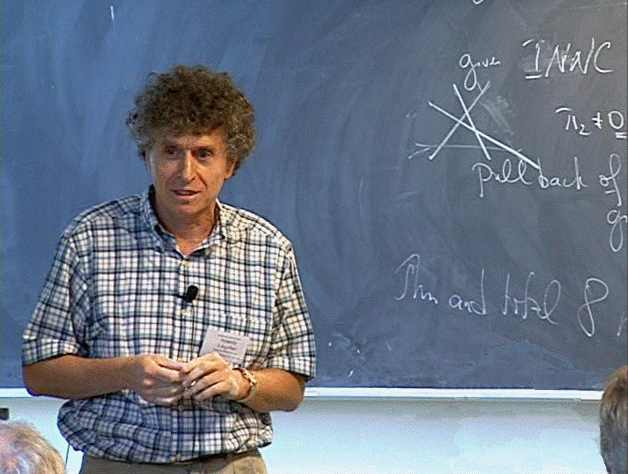
- Libgober during the Conference in honor of his 60th birthday (Jaca, Spain)
- Born: 1949 (age 75–76); Moscow, Soviet Union
- Occupation: Mathematician
- Website: homepages.math.uic.edu/~libgober/

Anatoly Libgober (born 1949, in Moscow) is a Russian/American mathematician, known for work in algebraic geometry and topology of algebraic varieties.

== Early life ==
Libgober was born in the Soviet Union, and immigrated to Israel in 1973 after active participation in the movement to change immigration policies in Soviet Union. He studied with Yuri Manin at Moscow University and with Boris Moishezon at Tel-Aviv University where he finished his PhD dissertation with Moishezon in 1977, doing his postdoctorate work at the Institute for Advanced Study (Princeton, N.J). He lectured extensively visiting, among others, l'Institut des hautes études scientifiques (Bures sur Ivette, France), the Max Planck Institute in Bonn (Germany), the Mathematical Sciences Research Institute (Berkeley), Harvard University and Columbia University. Currently he is Professor Emeritus at the University of Illinois at Chicago where he worked until his retirement in 2010. He has two children, Brian Libgober, a professor of political science and law at Northwestern University and Jonathan Libgober, a professor of economics at the University of Southern California, and a daughter in law, Jacqueline Vayntrub.

== Professional profile ==
Libgober's early work studies the diffeomorphism type of complete intersections in complex projective space. This later led to the discovery of relations between Hodge and Chern numbers. He introduced the technique of Alexander polynomial for the study of fundamental groups of the complements to plane algebraic curves. This led to Libgober's divisibility theorem and explicit relations between these fundamental groups, the position of singularities, and local invariants of singularities (the constants of quasi-adjunction). Later he introduced the characteristic varieties of the fundamental groups, providing a multivariable extension of Alexander polynomials, and applied these methods to the study of homotopy groups of the complements to hypersurfaces in projective spaces and the topology of arrangements of hyperplanes. In the early 90s he started work on interactions between algebraic geometry and physics, providing mirror symmetry predictions for the count of rational curves on complete intersections in projective spaces and developing the theory of elliptic genus of singular algebraic varieties.
