= Chiral homology =

In mathematics, chiral homology, introduced by Alexander Beilinson and Vladimir Drinfeld, is, in their words, "a “quantum” version of (the algebra of functions on) the space of global horizontal sections of an affine $\mathcal{D}_X$-scheme (i.e., the space of global solutions of a system of non-linear differential equations)."

Jacob Lurie's topological chiral homology gives an analog for manifolds.

== See also ==
- Ran space
- Chiral Lie algebra
- Factorization homology
