= Kravchuk polynomials =

Discrete orthogonal polynomials

Kravchuk polynomials or Krawtchouk polynomials (also written using several other transliterations of the Ukrainian surname Кравчу́к) are discrete orthogonal polynomials associated with the binomial distribution, introduced by Mykhailo Kravchuk (1929). The first few polynomials are (for q = 2):

$$\mathcal{K}_0(x; n) = 1,$$
$$\mathcal{K}_1(x; n) = -2x + n,$$
$$\mathcal{K}_2(x; n) = 2x^2 - 2nx + \binom{n}{2},$$
$$\mathcal{K}_3(x; n) = -\frac{4}{3}x^3 + 2nx^2 - (n^2 - n + \frac{2}{3})x + \binom{n}{3}.$$

The Kravchuk polynomials are a special case of the Meixner polynomials of the first kind.

== Definition ==
For any prime power q and positive integer n, define the Kravchuk polynomial
$$\begin{aligned}
\mathcal{K}_k(x; n,q) = \mathcal{K}_k(x) ={}&
\sum_{j=0}^{k}(-1)^j (q-1)^{k-j} \binom {x}{j} \binom{n-x}{k-j}
\\ ={}&
\sum_{j=0}^k (-1)^j (q-1)^{k-j} \frac{ x^{\underline{j}} }{ j! } \frac{ (n-x)^{\underline{k-j}} }{ (k-j)! }
\end{aligned}$$
for $k=0,1, \ldots, n$. In the second line, the factors depending on $x$ have been rewritten in terms of falling factorials, to aid readers uncomfortable with non-integer arguments of binomial coefficients.

== Properties ==
The Kravchuk polynomial has the following alternative expressions:

$$\mathcal{K}_k(x; n,q) = \sum_{j=0}^{k}(-q)^j (q-1)^{k-j} \binom {n-j}{k-j} \binom{x}{j}.$$
$$\mathcal{K}_k(x; n,q) = \sum_{j=0}^{k}(-1)^j q^{k-j} \binom {n-k+j}{j} \binom{n-x}{k-j}.$$

Note that there is more that merely recombination of material from the two binomial coefficients separating these from the above definition. In these formulae, only one term of the sum has degree $k$, whereas in the definition all terms have degree $k$.

=== Symmetry relations ===
For integers $i,k \ge 0$, we have that

$$\begin{align}
(q-1)^{i} {n \choose i} \mathcal{K}_k(i;n,q) = (q-1)^{k}{n \choose k} \mathcal{K}_i(k;n,q).
\end{align}$$

=== Orthogonality relations ===
For non-negative integers r, s,

$$\sum_{i=0}^n\binom{n}{i}(q-1)^i\mathcal{K}_r(i; n,q)\mathcal{K}_s(i; n,q) = q^n(q-1)^r\binom{n}{r}\delta_{r,s}.$$

=== Generating function ===
The generating series of Kravchuk polynomials is given as below. Here $z$ is a formal variable.

$$\begin{align}
(1+(q-1)z)^{n-x}(1-z)^x &= \sum_{k=0}^\infty \mathcal{K}_k(x;n,q) {z^k}.
\end{align}$$

=== Three term recurrence ===
The Kravchuk polynomials satisfy the three-term recurrence relation

$$\begin{align}
x \mathcal{K}_k(x;n,q) = - q(n-k) \mathcal{K}_{k+1}(x;n,q) + (q(n-k) + k(1-q)) \mathcal{K}_{k}(x;n,q) - k(1-q)\mathcal{K}_{k-1}(x;n,q).
\end{align}$$

== See also ==
- Krawtchouk matrix
- Hermite polynomials
