= Power-bounded element =

A power-bounded element is an element of a topological ring whose powers are bounded. These elements are used in the theory of adic spaces.

== Definition ==
Let $A$ be a topological ring. A subset $T \subset A$ is called bounded, if, for every neighbourhood $U$ of zero, there exists an open neighbourhood $V$ of zero such that $T \cdot V := \{t \cdot v \mid t \in T, v \in V\} \subset U$ holds. An element $a \in A$ is called power-bounded, if the set $\{a^n \mid n \in \mathbb N\}$ is bounded.

== Examples ==
- An element $x \in \mathbb R$ is power-bounded if and only if $|x| \leq 1$.
- More generally, if $A$ is a topological commutative ring whose topology is induced by an absolute value, then an element $x \in A$ is power-bounded if and only if $|x| \leq 1$ holds. If the absolute value is non-Archimedean, the power-bounded elements form a subring (a valuation ring), denoted by $A^{\circ}$. This follows from the ultrametric inequality.
- The ring of power-bounded elements in $\mathbb Q_p$, the p-adic numbers, is $\mathbb Q_p^{\circ} = \mathbb Z_p$.
- Every topologically nilpotent element is power-bounded.

== Literature ==
- Morel: Adic spaces
- Wedhorn: Adic spaces
