= Racah polynomials =

Class of mathematical polynomials

In mathematics, Racah polynomials are orthogonal polynomials named after Giulio Racah, as their orthogonality relations are equivalent to his orthogonality relations for Racah coefficients.

The Racah polynomials were first defined by Wilson (1978) and are given by

$$p_n(x(x+\gamma+\delta+1)) = {}_4F_3\left[\begin{matrix} -n &n+\alpha+\beta+1&-x&x+\gamma+\delta+1\\
\alpha+1&\gamma+1&\beta+\delta+1\\ \end{matrix};1\right].$$

== Orthogonality ==
$\sum_{y=0}^N\operatorname{R}_n(x;\alpha,\beta,\gamma,\delta) \operatorname{R}_m(x;\alpha,\beta,\gamma,\delta)\frac{\gamma+\delta+1+2y}{\gamma+\delta+1+y} \omega_y=h_n\operatorname{\delta}_{n,m},$
when $\alpha+1=-N$,
where $\operatorname{R}$ is the Racah polynomial,
$$x=y(y+\gamma+\delta+1),$$
$\operatorname{\delta}_{n,m}$ is the Kronecker delta function and the weight functions are
$$\omega_y=\frac{(\alpha+1)_y(\beta+\delta+1)_y(\gamma+1)_y(\gamma+\delta+2)_y}{(-\alpha+\gamma+\delta+1)_y(-\beta+\gamma+1)_y(\delta+1)_yy!},$$
and
$$h_n=\frac{(-\beta)_N(\gamma+\delta+1)_N}{(-\beta+\gamma+1)_N(\delta+1)_N}\frac{(n+\alpha+\beta+1)_nn!}{(\alpha+\beta+2)_{2n}}\frac{(\alpha+\delta-\gamma+1)_n(\alpha-\delta+1)_n(\beta+1)_n}{(\alpha+1)_n(\beta+\delta+1)_n(\gamma+1)_n},$$
$(\cdot)_n$ is the Pochhammer symbol.

== Rodrigues-type formula ==
$\omega(x;\alpha,\beta,\gamma,\delta)\operatorname{R}_n(\lambda(x);\alpha,\beta,\gamma,\delta)=(\gamma+\delta+1)_n\frac{\nabla^n}{\nabla\lambda(x)^n}\omega(x;\alpha+n,\beta+n,\gamma+n,\delta),$
where $\nabla$ is the backward difference operator,
$$\lambda(x)=x(x+\gamma+\delta+1).$$

== Generating functions ==
There are three generating functions for $x\in\{0,1,2,...,N\}$

when $\beta+\delta+1=-N\quad$or$\quad\gamma+1=-N,$
$${}_2F_1(-x,-x+\alpha-\gamma-\delta;\alpha+1;t){}_2F_1(x+\beta+\delta+1,x+\gamma+1;\beta+1;t)$$
$$\quad=\sum_{n=0}^N\frac{(\beta+\delta+1)_n(\gamma+1)_n}{(\beta+1)_nn!}\operatorname{R}_n(\lambda(x);\alpha,\beta,\gamma,\delta)t^n,$$
when $\alpha+1=-N\quad$or$\quad\gamma+1=-N,$
$${}_2F_1(-x,-x+\beta-\gamma;\beta+\delta+1;t){}_2F_1(x+\alpha+1,x+\gamma+1;\alpha-\delta+1;t)$$
$$\quad=\sum_{n=0}^N\frac{(\alpha+1)_n(\gamma+1)_n}{(\alpha-\delta+1)_nn!}\operatorname{R}_n(\lambda(x);\alpha,\beta,\gamma,\delta)t^n,$$
when $\alpha+1=-N\quad$or$\quad\beta+\delta+1=-N,$
$${}_2F_1(-x,-x-\delta;\gamma+1;t){}_2F_1(x+\alpha+1;x+\beta+\gamma+1;\alpha+\beta-\gamma+1;t)$$
$$\quad=\sum_{n=0}^N\frac{(\alpha+1)_n(\beta+\delta+1)_n}{(\alpha+\beta-\gamma+1)_nn!}\operatorname{R}_n(\lambda(x);\alpha,\beta,\gamma,\delta)t^n.$$

== Connection formula for Wilson polynomials ==
When $\alpha=a+b-1,\beta=c+d-1,\gamma=a+d-1,\delta=a-d,x\rightarrow-a+ix,$

$$\operatorname{R}_n(\lambda(-a+ix);a+b-1,c+d-1,a+d-1,a-d)=\frac{\operatorname{W}_n(x^2;a,b,c,d)}{(a+b)_n(a+c)_n(a+d)_n},$$
where $\operatorname{W}$ are Wilson polynomials.

== q-analog ==
Askey & Wilson (1979) introduced the q-Racah polynomials defined in terms of basic hypergeometric functions by

$$p_n(q^{-x}+q^{x+1}cd;a,b,c,d;q) = {}_4\phi_3\left[\begin{matrix} q^{-n} &abq^{n+1}&q^{-x}&q^{x+1}cd\\
aq&bdq&cq\\ \end{matrix};q;q\right].$$

They are sometimes given with changes of variables as

$$W_n(x;a,b,c,N;q) = {}_4\phi_3\left[\begin{matrix} q^{-n} &abq^{n+1}&q^{-x}&cq^{x-n}\\
aq&bcq&q^{-N}\\ \end{matrix};q;q\right].$$
