= Vladimir Drinfeld =

Mathematician

- Born: February 14, 1954 (age 72); Kharkiv, Ukrainian SSR, Soviet Union (now Kharkiv, Ukraine)
- Education: Moscow State University
- Known for: Drinfeld center Drinfeld double Drinfeld level structure Drinfeld module Drinfeld reciprocity Drinfeld upper half plane Drinfeld twist Drinfeld–Sokolov reduction Drinfeld–Sokolov–Wilson equation ADHM construction Manin–Drinfeld theorem Yetter–Drinfeld category Chiral algebra Chiral homology Quantum groups Geometric Langlands correspondence Grothendieck–Teichmüller group Lie-* algebra Opers; Quantum affine algebra Quantized enveloping algebra Quasi-bialgebra; Quasi-triangular quasi-Hopf algebra Ruziewicz problem Tate modules
- Awards: Fields Medal (1990); Wolf Prize (2018); Shaw Prize (2023)
- Scientific career
- Fields: Mathematics
- Workplaces: University of Chicago
- Doctoral advisor: Yuri Manin

Vladimir Gershonovich Drinfeld (Ukrainian: Володи́мир Ге́ршонович Дрінфельд; born February 14, 1954), surname also romanized as Drinfel'd, is a mathematician from Ukraine, who immigrated to the US and works at the University of Chicago.

Drinfeld's work connected algebraic geometry over finite fields with number theory, especially the theory of automorphic forms, through the notions of elliptic module and the theory of the geometric Langlands correspondence. Drinfeld introduced the notion of a quantum group (independently discovered by Michio Jimbo at the same time) and made important contributions to mathematical physics, including the ADHM construction of instantons, algebraic formalism of the quantum inverse scattering method, and the Drinfeld–Sokolov reduction in the theory of solitons.

He was awarded the Fields Medal in 1990. In 2016, he was elected to the National Academy of Sciences. In 2018 he received the Wolf Prize in Mathematics. In 2023 he was awarded the Shaw Prize in Mathematical Sciences.

== Early life, family and education ==
Drinfeld was born into a Jewish family, in Kharkiv, Ukrainian SSR, Soviet Union in 1954. The family was well-steeped in mathematics.

In 1969, at the age of 15, Drinfeld represented the Soviet Union at the International Mathematics Olympiad in Bucharest, Romania, and won a gold medal with the full score of 40 points. He was, at the time, the youngest participant to achieve a perfect score, a record that has since been surpassed by only four others including Sergei Konyagin and Noam Elkies.

Drinfeld entered Moscow State University in the same year and graduated from it in 1974. Drinfeld was awarded the Candidate of Sciences degree in 1978 and the Doctor of Sciences degree from the Steklov Institute of Mathematics in 1988.

== Career ==
From 1981 until 1999, he worked at the Verkin Institute for Low Temperature Physics and Engineering (Department of Mathematical Physics). Drinfeld moved to the US in January 1999 where he began working at the University of Chicago.

== Contributions to mathematics ==
In 1974, at the age of twenty, Drinfeld announced a proof of the Langlands conjectures for GL_{2} over a global field of positive characteristic. In the course of proving the conjectures, Drinfeld introduced a new class of objects that he called "elliptic modules" (now known as Drinfeld modules). Later, in 1983, Drinfeld published a short article that expanded the scope of the Langlands conjectures. The Langlands conjectures, when published in 1967, could be seen as a sort of non-abelian class field theory. It postulated the existence of a natural one-to-one correspondence between Galois representations and some automorphic forms. The "naturalness" is guaranteed by the essential coincidence of L-functions. However, this condition is purely arithmetic and cannot be considered for a general one-dimensional function field in a straightforward way. Drinfeld pointed out that instead of automorphic forms one can consider automorphic perverse sheaves or automorphic D-modules. "Automorphicity" of these modules and the Langlands correspondence could be then understood in terms of the action of Hecke operators.

Drinfeld has also worked in mathematical physics. In collaboration with his advisor Yuri Manin, he constructed the moduli space of Yang–Mills instantons, a result that was proved independently by Michael Atiyah and Nigel Hitchin. Drinfeld coined the term "quantum group" in reference to Hopf algebras that are deformations of simple Lie algebras, and connected them to the study of the Yang–Baxter equation, which is a necessary condition for the solvability of statistical mechanical models. He also generalized Hopf algebras to quasi-Hopf algebras and introduced the study of Drinfeld twists, which can be used to factorize the R-matrix corresponding to the solution of the Yang–Baxter equation associated with a quasitriangular Hopf algebra.

Drinfeld has also collaborated with Alexander Beilinson to rebuild the theory of vertex algebras in a coordinate-free form, which have become increasingly important to two-dimensional conformal field theory, string theory, and the geometric Langlands program. Drinfeld and Beilinson published their work in 2004 in a book titled "Chiral Algebras."

== See also ==
- Drinfeld reciprocity
- Drinfeld upper half plane
- Manin–Drinfeld theorem
- Quantum group
- Chiral algebra
- Quasitriangular Hopf algebra
- Ruziewicz problem
