= Cosheaf =

In topology, a branch of mathematics, a cosheaf is a dual notion to that of a sheaf that is useful in studying Borel-Moore homology.

== Definition ==
We associate to a topological space $X$ its category of open sets $\operatorname{Op}(X)$, whose objects are the open sets of $X$, with a (unique) morphism from $U$ to $V$ whenever $U \subset V$. Fix a category $\mathcal{C}$. Then a precosheaf (with values in $\mathcal{C}$) is a covariant functor $F : \operatorname{Op}X \to \mathcal{C}$, i.e., $F$ consists of

- for each open set $U$ of $X$, an object $F(U)$ in $\mathcal{C}$, and
- for each inclusion of open sets $U \subset V$, a morphism $\iota_{U,V} : F(U) \to F(V)$ in $\mathcal{C}$ such that
  - $\iota_{U,U} = \mathrm{id}_{F(U)}$ for all $U$ and
  - $\iota_{U,V} \circ \iota_{V,W} = \iota_{U,W}$ whenever $U \subset V \subset W$.

Suppose now that $\mathcal{C}$ is an abelian category that admits small colimits. Then a cosheaf is a precosheaf $F$ for which the sequence

$$\bigoplus_{(\alpha,\beta)}F(U_{\alpha,\beta}) \xrightarrow{\sum_{(\alpha,\beta)} (\iota_{U_{\alpha,\beta},U_\alpha} - \iota_{U_{\alpha,\beta},U_\beta})} \bigoplus_{\alpha} F(U_\alpha) \xrightarrow{\sum_\alpha \iota_{U_\alpha,U}} F(U) \to 0$$

is exact for every collection $\{U_\alpha\}_\alpha$ of open sets, where $U := \bigcup_\alpha U_\alpha$ and $U_{\alpha,\beta} := U_\alpha \cap U_\beta$. (Notice that this is dual to the sheaf condition.) Approximately, exactness at $F(U)$ means that every element over $U$ can be represented as a finite sum of elements that live over the smaller opens $U_\alpha$, while exactness at $\bigoplus_\alpha F(U_\alpha)$ means that, when we compare two such representations of the same element, their difference must be captured by a finite collection of elements living over the intersections $U_{\alpha,\beta}$.

Equivalently, $F$ is a cosheaf if

- for all open sets $U$ and $V$, $F(U \cup V)$ is the pushout of $F(U \cap V) \to F(U)$ and $F(U \cap V) \to F(V)$, and
- for any upward-directed family $\{U_\alpha\}_\alpha$ of open sets, the canonical morphism $\varinjlim F(U_\alpha) \to F\left(\bigcup_\alpha U_\alpha\right)$ is an isomorphism. One can show that this definition agrees with the previous one. This one, however, has the benefit of making sense even when $\mathcal{C}$ is not an abelian category.

== Examples ==
A motivating example of a precosheaf of abelian groups is the singular precosheaf, sending an open set $U$ to $C_{k}(U; \mathbb{Z})$, the free abelian group of singular $k$-chains on $U$. In particular, there is a natural inclusion $\iota_{U,V} : C_{k}(U; \mathbb{Z}) \to C_{k}(V; \mathbb{Z})$ whenever $U \subset V$. However, this fails to be a cosheaf because a singular simplex cannot be broken up into smaller pieces. To fix this, we let $s : C_{k}(U; \mathbb{Z}) \to C_{k}(U; \mathbb{Z})$ be the barycentric subdivision homomorphism and define $\overline{C}_{k}(U; \mathbb{Z})$ to be the colimit of the diagram

$$C_{k}(U; \mathbb{Z}) \xrightarrow{s} C_{k}(U; \mathbb{Z}) \xrightarrow{s} C_{k}(U; \mathbb{Z}) \xrightarrow{s} \ldots.$$

In the colimit, a simplex is identified with all of its barycentric subdivisions. One can show using the Lebesgue number lemma that the precosheaf sending $U$ to $\overline{C}_{k}(U; \mathbb{Z})$ is in fact a cosheaf.

Fix a continuous map $f : Y \to X$ of topological spaces. Then the precosheaf (on $X$) of topological spaces sending $U$ to $f^{-1}(U)$ is a cosheaf.
