= Almost ring =

Objects between rings and their fields of fractions

In mathematics, almost modules and almost rings are certain objects interpolating between rings and their fields of fractions. They were introduced by Gerd Faltings (1988) in his study of p-adic Hodge theory.

== Almost modules ==
Let V be a local integral domain with the maximal ideal m, and K a fraction field of V. The category of K-modules, K-Mod, may be obtained as a quotient of V-Mod by the Serre subcategory of torsion modules, i.e. those N such that any element n in N is annihilated by some nonzero element in the maximal ideal. If the category of torsion modules is replaced by a smaller subcategory, we obtain an intermediate step between V-modules and K-modules. Faltings proposed to use the subcategory of almost zero modules, i.e. N ∈ V-Mod such that any element n in N is annihilated by all elements of the maximal ideal.

For this idea to work, m and V must satisfy certain technical conditions. Let V be a ring (not necessarily local) and m ⊆ V an idempotent ideal, i.e. an ideal such that m^{2} = m. Assume also that m ⊗ m is a flat V-module. A module N over V is almost zero with respect to such m if for all ε ∈ m and n ∈ N we have εn = 0. Almost zero modules form a Serre subcategory of the category of V-modules. The category of almost V-modules, V^{a}-Mod, is a localization of V-Mod along this subcategory.

The quotient functor V-Mod → V^{a}-Mod is denoted by $N \mapsto N^a$. The assumptions on m guarantee that $(-)^a$ is an exact functor which has both the right adjoint functor $M \mapsto M_*$ and the left adjoint functor $M \mapsto M_!$. Moreover, $(-)_*$ is full and faithful. The category of almost modules is complete and cocomplete.

== Almost rings ==
The tensor product of V-modules descends to a monoidal structure on V^{a}-Mod. An almost module R ∈ V^{a}-Mod with a map R ⊗ R → R satisfying natural conditions, similar to a definition of a ring, is called an almost V-algebra or an almost ring if the context is unambiguous. Many standard properties of algebras and morphisms between them carry to the "almost" world.

=== Example ===
In the original paper by Faltings, V was the integral closure of a discrete valuation ring in the algebraic closure of its quotient field, and m its maximal ideal. For example, let V be $\mathbb{Z}_p[p^{1/p^{\infty}}]$, i.e. a p-adic completion of $\operatorname{colim}\limits_n \mathbb{Z}_p[p^{1/p^n}]$. Take m to be the maximal ideal of this ring. Then the quotient V/m is an almost zero module, while V/p is a torsion, but not almost zero module since the class of p^{1/p^{2}} in the quotient is not annihilated by p^{1/p^{2}} considered as an element of m.
