= Goddard–Thorn theorem =

Theorem in string theory

In mathematics, and in particular in the mathematical background of string theory, the Goddard–Thorn theorem (also called the no-ghost theorem) is a theorem describing properties of a functor that quantizes bosonic strings. It is named after Peter Goddard and Charles Thorn.

The name "no-ghost theorem" stems from the fact that in the original statement of the theorem, the natural inner product induced on the output vector space is positive definite. Thus, there were no so-called ghosts (Pauli–Villars ghosts), or vectors of negative norm. The name "no-ghost theorem" is also a word play on the no-go theorem of quantum mechanics.

== Statement ==
This statement is that of Borcherds (1992).

Suppose that $V$ is a unitary representation of the Virasoro algebra $\mathrm{Vir}$, so $V$ is equipped with a non-degenerate bilinear form $(\cdot, \cdot)$ and there is an algebra homomorphism $\rho: \mathrm{Vir} \rightarrow \mathrm{End}(V)$ so that
$$\rho(L_i)^\dagger = \rho(L_{-i})$$
where the adjoint is defined with respect to the bilinear form, and
$$\rho(c) = 24\mathrm{id}_V.$$
Suppose also that $V$ decomposes into a direct sum of eigenspaces of $L_0$ with non-negative, integer eigenvalues $i \geq 0$, denoted $V^i$, and that each $V^i$ is finite dimensional (giving $V$ a $\mathbb{Z}_{\geq 0}$-grading). Assume also that $V$ admits an action from a group $G$ that preserves this grading.

For the two-dimensional even unimodular Lorentzian lattice II_{1,1}, denote the corresponding lattice vertex algebra by $V_{II_{1,1}}$. This is a II_{1,1}-graded algebra with a bilinear form and carries an action of the Virasoro algebra.

Let $P^1$ be the subspace of the vertex algebra $V \otimes V_{II_{1,1}}$ consisting of vectors $v$ such that $L_0 \cdot v = v, L_n \cdot v = 0$ for $n > 0$. Let $P^1_r$ be the subspace of $P^1$ of degree $r \in II_{1,1}$. Each space inherits a $G$-action which acts as prescribed on $V$ and trivially on $V_{II_{1,1}}$.

The quotient of $P^1_r$ by the nullspace of its bilinear form is naturally isomorphic as a $G$-module with an invariant bilinear form, to $V^{1 - (r,r)/2}$ if $r \neq 0$ and $V^1 \oplus \mathbb{R}^2$ if $r = 0$.

=== II_{1,1} ===
The lattice II_{1,1} is the rank 2 lattice with bilinear form
$$\begin{pmatrix} 0 & -1 \\ -1 & 0 \end{pmatrix}.$$
This is even, unimodular and integral with signature (+,-).

== Formalism ==
There are two naturally isomorphic functors that are typically used to quantize bosonic strings. In both cases, one starts with positive-energy representations of the Virasoro algebra of central charge 26, equipped with Virasoro-invariant bilinear forms, and ends up with vector spaces equipped with bilinear forms. Here, "Virasoro-invariant" means L_{n} is adjoint to L_{−n} for all integers n.

The first functor historically is "old canonical quantization", and it is given by taking the quotient of the weight 1 primary subspace by the radical of the bilinear form. Here, "primary subspace" is the set of vectors annihilated by L_{n} for all strictly positive n, and "weight 1" means L_{0} acts by identity. A second, naturally isomorphic functor, is given by degree 1 BRST cohomology. Older treatments of BRST cohomology often have a shift in the degree due to a change in choice of BRST charge, so one may see degree −1/2 cohomology in papers and texts from before 1995. A proof that the functors are naturally isomorphic can be found in Section 4.4 of Polchinski's String Theory text.

The Goddard–Thorn theorem amounts to the assertion that this quantization functor more or less cancels the addition of two free bosons, as conjectured by Lovelace in 1971. Lovelace's precise claim was that at critical dimension 26, Virasoro-type Ward identities cancel two full sets of oscillators. Mathematically, this is the following claim:

Let V be a unitarizable Virasoro representation of central charge 24 with Virasoro-invariant bilinear form, and let π^{1,1}_{λ} be the irreducible module of the R^{1,1} Heisenberg Lie algebra attached to a nonzero vector λ in R^{1,1}. Then the image of V ⊗ π^{1,1}_{λ} under quantization is canonically isomorphic to the subspace of V on which L_{0} acts by 1-(λ,λ).

The no-ghost property follows immediately, since the positive-definite Hermitian structure of V is transferred to the image under quantization.

== Applications ==
The bosonic string quantization functors described here can be applied to any conformal vertex algebra of central charge 26, and the output naturally has a Lie algebra structure. The Goddard–Thorn theorem can then be applied to concretely describe the Lie algebra in terms of the input vertex algebra.

Perhaps the most spectacular case of this application is Richard Borcherds's proof of the monstrous moonshine conjecture, where the unitarizable Virasoro representation is the monster vertex algebra (also called "moonshine module") constructed by Frenkel, Lepowsky, and Meurman. By taking a tensor product with the vertex algebra attached to a rank-2 hyperbolic lattice, and applying quantization, one obtains the monster Lie algebra, which is a generalized Kac–Moody algebra graded by the lattice. By using the Goddard–Thorn theorem, Borcherds showed that the homogeneous pieces of the Lie algebra are naturally isomorphic to graded pieces of the moonshine module, as representations of the monster simple group.

Earlier applications include Frenkel's determination of upper bounds on the root multiplicities of the Kac–Moody Lie algebra whose Dynkin diagram is the Leech lattice, and Borcherds's construction of a generalized Kac–Moody Lie algebra that contains Frenkel's Lie algebra and saturates Frenkel's 1/∆ bound.
