= Algebraic character =

Mathematical concept

In mathematics, an algebraic character is a formal expression attached to a module in representation theory of semisimple Lie algebras that generalizes the character of a finite-dimensional representation and is analogous to the Harish-Chandra character of the representations of semisimple Lie groups.

== Definition ==
Let $\mathfrak{g}$ be a semisimple Lie algebra with a fixed Cartan subalgebra $\mathfrak{h},$ and let the abelian group $A=\mathbb{Z}[[\mathfrak{h}^*]]$ consist of the (possibly infinite) formal integral linear combinations of $e^{\mu}$, where $\mu\in\mathfrak{h}^*$, the (complex) vector space of weights. Suppose that $V$ is a locally-finite weight module. Then the algebraic character of $V$ is an element of $A$ defined by the formula:

$$ch(V)=\sum_{\mu}\dim V_{\mu}e^{\mu},$$

where the sum is taken over all weight spaces of the module $V.$

== Example ==
The algebraic character of the Verma module $M_\lambda$ with the highest weight $\lambda$ is given by the formula

$$ch(M_{\lambda})=\frac{e^{\lambda}}{\prod_{\alpha>0}(1-e^{-\alpha})},$$

with the product taken over the set of positive roots.

== Properties ==
Algebraic characters are defined for locally-finite weight modules and are additive, i.e. the character of a direct sum of modules is the sum of their characters. On the other hand, although one can define multiplication of the formal exponents by the formula $e^{\mu}\cdot e^{\nu}=e^{\mu+\nu}$ and extend it to their finite linear combinations by linearity, this does not make $A$ into a ring, because of the possibility of formal infinite sums. Thus the product of algebraic characters is well defined only in restricted situations; for example, for the case of a highest weight module, or a finite-dimensional module. In good situations, the algebraic character is multiplicative, i.e., the character of the tensor product of two weight modules is the product of their characters.

== Generalization ==
Characters also can be defined almost verbatim for weight modules over a Kac–Moody or generalized Kac–Moody Lie algebra.

== See also ==
- Algebraic representation
- Weyl-Kac character formula
