= Kac–Moody algebra =

Lie algebra, usually infinite-dimensional

In mathematics, a Kac–Moody algebra (named for Victor Kac and Robert Moody, who independently and simultaneously discovered them in 1968) is a Lie algebra, usually infinite-dimensional, that can be defined by generators and relations through a generalized Cartan matrix. These algebras form a generalization of finite-dimensional semisimple Lie algebras, and many properties related to the structure of a Lie algebra such as its root system, irreducible representations, and connection to flag manifolds have natural analogues in the Kac–Moody setting.

A class of Kac–Moody algebras called affine Lie algebras is of particular importance in mathematics and theoretical physics, especially two-dimensional conformal field theory and the theory of exactly solvable models. Kac discovered an elegant proof of certain combinatorial identities, the Macdonald identities, which is based on the representation theory of affine Kac–Moody algebras. Howard Garland and James Lepowsky demonstrated that Rogers–Ramanujan identities can be derived in a similar fashion.

== History of Kac–Moody algebras ==
The initial construction by Élie Cartan and Wilhelm Killing of finite dimensional simple Lie algebras from the Cartan integers was type dependent. In 1966 Jean-Pierre Serre showed that relations of Claude Chevalley and Harish-Chandra, with simplifications by Nathan Jacobson, give a defining presentation for the Lie algebra. One could thus describe a simple Lie algebra in terms of generators and relations using data from the matrix of Cartan integers, which is naturally positive definite.

"Almost simultaneously in 1967, Victor Kac in the USSR and Robert Moody in Canada developed what was to become Kac–Moody algebra. Kac and Moody noticed that if Wilhelm Killing's conditions were relaxed, it was still possible to associate to the Cartan matrix a Lie algebra which, necessarily, would be infinite dimensional." – A. J. Coleman

In his 1967 thesis, Robert Moody considered Lie algebras whose Cartan matrix is no longer positive definite. This still gave rise to a Lie algebra, but one which is now infinite dimensional. Simultaneously, Z-graded Lie algebras were being studied in Moscow where I. L. Kantor introduced and studied a general class of Lie algebras including what eventually became known as Kac–Moody algebras. Victor Kac was also studying simple or nearly simple Lie algebras with polynomial growth. A rich mathematical theory of infinite dimensional Lie algebras evolved. An account of the subject, which also includes works of many others is given in (Kac 1990). See also (Seligman 1987).

== Introduction ==
Given an n×n generalized Cartan matrix
$$C = \begin{pmatrix} c_{ij}\end{pmatrix}$$
, one can construct a Lie algebra $\mathfrak{g}'(C)$ defined by generators $e_i$, $h_i$, and $f_i \left(i \in \{1, \ldots, n\}\right)$ and relations given by:

- $\left[h_i, h_j\right] = 0\$ for all $i, j \in \{1, \ldots, n\}$;
- $\left[h_i, e_j\right] = c_{ij}e_j$;
- $\left[h_i, f_j\right] = -c_{ij}f_j$;
- $\left[e_i, f_j\right] = \delta_{ij}h_i$, where $\delta_{ij}$ is the Kronecker delta;
- If $i \neq j$ (so $c_{ij} \leq 0$) then $\textrm{ad}(e_i)^{1-c_{ij}}(e_j) = 0$ and $\operatorname{ad}(f_i)^{1-c_{ij}}(f_j) = 0$, where $\operatorname{ad}: \mathfrak{g}\to\operatorname{End}(\mathfrak{g}),\operatorname{ad}(x)(y) = [x, y],$ is the adjoint representation of $\mathfrak{g}$.

Under a "symmetrizability" assumption, $\mathfrak{g}'(C)$ identifies with the derived subalgebra $\mathfrak{g}'(C) = [\mathfrak{g}(C), \mathfrak{g}(C)]$ of the affine Kac-Moody algebra $\mathfrak{g}(C)$ defined below.

== Definition ==
Assume we are given an $n \times n$ generalized Cartan matrix C = (c_{ij}) of rank r. For every such $C$, there exists a unique up to isomorphism realization of $C$, i.e. a triple $(\mathfrak{h}, \{\alpha_i\}_{i = 1}^n, \{\alpha_i^\vee\}_{i = 1}^n,$) where $\mathfrak{h}$ is a complex vector space, $\{\alpha_i^\vee\}_{i = 1}^n$ is a subset of elements of $\mathfrak{h}$, and $\{\alpha_i\}_{i = 1}^n$ is a subset of the dual space $\mathfrak{h}^*$ satisfying the following three conditions:

1. The vector space $\mathfrak{h}$ has dimension 2n − r
2. The sets $\{\alpha_i\}_{i = 1}^n$ and $\{\alpha_i^\vee\}_{i = 1}^n$ are linearly independent and
3. For every $1 \leq i, j \leq n, \alpha_i\left(\alpha_j^\vee\right) = c_{ji}$.

The $\alpha_i$ are analogue to the simple roots of a semi-simple Lie algebra, and the $\alpha_i^\vee$ to the simple coroots.

Then we define the Kac-Moody algebra associated to $C$ as the Lie algebra $\mathfrak{g} := \mathfrak{g}(C)$ defined by generators $e_i$ and $f_i \left(i \in \{1, \ldots, n\}\right)$ and the elements of $\mathfrak{h}$ and relations

- $\left[h, h'\right] = 0\$ for $h,h' \in \mathfrak{h}$;
- $\left[h, e_i\right] = \alpha_i(h)e_i$, for $h \in \mathfrak{h}$;
- $\left[h, f_i\right] = -\alpha_i(h)f_i$, for $h \in \mathfrak{h}$;
- $\left[e_i, f_j\right] = \delta_{ij}\alpha_i^\vee$, where $\delta_{ij}$ is the Kronecker delta;
- If $i \neq j$ (so $c_{ij} \leq 0$) then $\textrm{ad}(e_i)^{1-c_{ij}}(e_j) = 0$ and $\operatorname{ad}(f_i)^{1-c_{ij}}(f_j) = 0$, where $\operatorname{ad}: \mathfrak{g}\to\operatorname{End}(\mathfrak{g}),\operatorname{ad}(x)(y) = [x, y],$ is the adjoint representation of $\mathfrak{g}$.

A real (possibly infinite-dimensional) Lie algebra is also considered a Kac–Moody algebra if its complexification is a Kac–Moody algebra.

== Root-space decomposition of a Kac–Moody algebra ==
$\mathfrak{h}$ is the analogue of a Cartan subalgebra for the Kac–Moody algebra $\mathfrak{g}$.

If $x\neq 0$ is an element of $\mathfrak{g}$ such that

$$\forall h\in\mathfrak{h}, [h, x] = \lambda(h)x$$

for some $\lambda\in\mathfrak{h}^*\backslash\{0\}$, then $x$ is called a root vector and $\lambda$ is a root of $\mathfrak{g}$. (The zero functional is not considered a root by convention.) The set of all roots of $\mathfrak{g}$ is often denoted by $\Delta$ and sometimes by $R$. For a given root $\lambda$, one denotes by $\mathfrak{g}_\lambda$ the root space of $\lambda$; that is,

$$\mathfrak{g}_\lambda = \{x\in\mathfrak{g}:\forall h\in\mathfrak{h}, [h,x] = \lambda(h)x\}$$.

It follows from the defining relations of $\mathfrak{g}$ that $e_i\in\mathfrak{g}_{\alpha_i}$ and $f_i\in\mathfrak{g}_{-\alpha_i}$. Also, if $x_1\in\mathfrak{g}_{\lambda_1}$ and $x_2\in\mathfrak{g}_{\lambda_2}$, then $\left[x_1, x_2\right]\in\mathfrak{g}_{\lambda_1+\lambda_2}$ by the Jacobi identity.

A fundamental result of the theory is that any Kac–Moody algebra can be decomposed into the direct sum of $\mathfrak{h}$ and its root spaces, that is

$$\mathfrak{g} = \mathfrak{h}\oplus\bigoplus_{\lambda\in\Delta} \mathfrak{g}_\lambda$$,

and that every root $\lambda$ can be written as $\lambda = \sum_{i=1}^n z_i\alpha_i$ with all the $z_i$ being integers of the same sign.

== Types of Kac–Moody algebras ==
Properties of a Kac–Moody algebra are controlled by the algebraic properties of its generalized Cartan matrix C. In order to classify Kac–Moody algebras, it is enough to consider the case of an indecomposable matrix C, that is, assume that there is no decomposition of the set of indices I into a disjoint union of non-empty subsets I_{1} and I_{2} such that C_{ij} = 0 for all i in I_{1} and j in I_{2}. Any decomposition of the generalized Cartan matrix leads to the direct sum decomposition of the corresponding Kac–Moody algebra:

$$\mathfrak{g}(C) \simeq \mathfrak{g}\left(C_1\right) \oplus \mathfrak{g}\left(C_2\right),$$

where the two Kac–Moody algebras in the right hand side are associated with the submatrices of C corresponding to the index sets I_{1} and I_{2}.

An important subclass of Kac–Moody algebras corresponds to symmetrizable generalized Cartan matrices C, which can be decomposed as DS, where D is a diagonal matrix with positive integer entries and S is a symmetric matrix. Under the assumptions that C is symmetrizable and indecomposable, the Kac–Moody algebras are divided into three classes:

- A positive definite matrix S gives rise to a finite-dimensional simple Lie algebra.
- A positive semidefinite matrix S gives rise to an infinite-dimensional Kac–Moody algebra of affine type, or an affine Lie algebra.
- An indefinite matrix S gives rise to a Kac–Moody algebra of indefinite type.
- Since the diagonal entries of C and D are positive, S cannot be negative definite or negative semidefinite.

Symmetrizable indecomposable generalized Cartan matrices of finite and affine type have been completely classified. They correspond to Dynkin diagrams and affine Dynkin diagrams. Little is known about the Kac–Moody algebras of indefinite type, although the groups corresponding to these Kac–Moody algebras were constructed over arbitrary fields by Jacques Tits.

Among the Kac–Moody algebras of indefinite type, most work has focused on those hyperbolic type, for which the matrix S is indefinite, but for each proper subset of I, the corresponding submatrix is positive definite or positive semidefinite. Hyperbolic Kac–Moody algebras have rank at most 10, and they have been completely classified. There are infinitely many of rank 2, and 238 of ranks between 3 and 10.

== See also ==
- Weyl–Kac character formula
- Generalized Kac–Moody algebra
- Integrable module
- Monstrous moonshine
