= Affine Lie algebra =

Type of Kac–Moody algebras

In mathematics, an affine Lie algebra is an infinite-dimensional Lie algebra that is constructed in a canonical fashion out of a finite-dimensional simple Lie algebra. Given an affine Lie algebra, one can also form the associated affine Kac-Moody algebra, as described below. From a purely mathematical point of view, affine Lie algebras are interesting because their representation theory, like representation theory of finite-dimensional semisimple Lie algebras, is much better understood than that of general Kac–Moody algebras. As observed by Victor Kac, the character formula for representations of affine Lie algebras implies certain combinatorial identities, the Macdonald identities.

Affine Lie algebras play an important role in string theory and two-dimensional conformal field theory due to the way they are constructed: starting from a simple Lie algebra $\mathfrak{g}$, one considers the loop algebra, $L\mathfrak{g}$, formed by the $\mathfrak{g}$-valued functions on a circle (interpreted as the closed string) with pointwise commutator. The affine Lie algebra $\hat{\mathfrak{g}}$ is obtained by adding one extra dimension to the loop algebra and modifying the commutator in a non-trivial way, which physicists call a quantum anomaly (in this case, the anomaly of the WZW model) and mathematicians a central extension. More generally, if σ is an automorphism of the simple Lie algebra $\mathfrak{g}$ associated to an automorphism of its Dynkin diagram, the twisted loop algebra $L_\sigma\mathfrak{g}$ consists of $\mathfrak{g}$-valued functions f on the real line which satisfy the twisted periodicity condition f(x + 2π) = σ f(x). Their central extensions are precisely the twisted affine Lie algebras. The point of view of string theory helps to understand many deep properties of affine Lie algebras, such as the fact that the characters of their representations transform amongst themselves under the modular group.

== Affine Lie algebras from simple Lie algebras ==
=== Definition ===
If $\mathfrak{g}$ is a finite-dimensional simple Lie algebra, the corresponding affine Lie algebra $\hat{\mathfrak{g}}$ is constructed as a central extension of the loop algebra $\mathfrak{g}\otimes\mathbb{\Complex}[t,t^{-1}]$, with one-dimensional center $\mathbb{\Complex}c.$ As a vector space,

$$\widehat{\mathfrak{g}}=\mathfrak{g}\otimes\mathbb{\Complex}[t,t^{-1}]\oplus\mathbb{\Complex}c,$$

where $\mathbb{\Complex}[t,t^{-1}]$ is the complex vector space of Laurent polynomials in the indeterminate t. The Lie bracket is defined by the formula

$$[a\otimes t^n+\alpha c, b\otimes t^m+\beta c]=[a,b]\otimes t^{n+m}+\langle a|b\rangle n\delta_{m+n,0}c$$

for all $a,b\in\mathfrak{g}, \alpha,\beta\in\mathbb{\Complex}$ and $n,m\in\mathbb{Z}$, where $[a,b]$ is the Lie bracket in the Lie algebra $\mathfrak{g}$ and $\langle\cdot |\cdot\rangle$ is the Cartan-Killing form on $\mathfrak{g}.$

The affine Lie algebra corresponding to a finite-dimensional semisimple Lie algebra is the direct sum of the affine Lie algebras corresponding to its simple summands. There is a distinguished derivation of the affine Lie algebra defined by

$$\delta (a\otimes t^m+\alpha c) = t{d\over dt} (a\otimes t^m).$$

The corresponding affine Kac–Moody algebra is defined as a semidirect product by adding an extra generator d that satisfies [d, A] = δ(A).

=== Constructing the Dynkin diagrams ===
The Dynkin diagram of each affine Lie algebra consists of that of the corresponding simple Lie algebra plus an additional node, which corresponds to the addition of an imaginary root. Of course, such a node cannot be attached to the Dynkin diagram in just any location, but for each simple Lie algebra there exists a number of possible attachments equal to the cardinality of the group of outer automorphisms of the Lie algebra. In particular, this group always contains the identity element, and the corresponding affine Lie algebra is called an untwisted affine Lie algebra. When the simple algebra admits automorphisms that are not inner automorphisms, one may obtain other Dynkin diagrams and these correspond to twisted affine Lie algebras.

Dynkin diagrams for affine Lie algebras
The set of extended (untwisted) affine Dynkin diagrams, with added nodes in green	"Twisted" affine forms are named with (2) or (3) superscripts. (k is the number of nodes in the graph)

=== Classifying the central extensions ===
The attachment of an extra node to the Dynkin diagram of the corresponding simple Lie algebra corresponds to the following construction. An affine Lie algebra can always be constructed as a central extension of the loop algebra of the corresponding simple Lie algebra. If one wishes to begin instead with a semisimple Lie algebra, then one needs to centrally extend by a number of elements equal to the number of simple components of the semisimple algebra. In physics, one often considers instead the direct sum of a semisimple algebra and an abelian algebra $\mathbb{\Complex}^n$. In this case one also needs to add n further central elements for the n abelian generators.

The second integral cohomology of the loop group of the corresponding simple compact Lie group is isomorphic to the integers. Central extensions of the affine Lie group by a single generator are topologically circle bundles over this free loop group, which are classified by a two-class known as the first Chern class of the fibration. Therefore, the central extensions of an affine Lie group are classified by a single parameter k which is called the level in the physics literature, where it first appeared. Unitary highest weight representations of the affine compact groups only exist when k is a natural number. More generally, if one considers a semi-simple algebra, there is a central charge for each simple component.

== Structure ==
=== Cartan–Weyl basis ===
As in the finite case, determining the Cartan–Weyl basis is an important step in determining the structure of affine Lie algebras.

Fix a finite-dimensional, simple, complex Lie algebra $\mathfrak{g}$ with Cartan subalgebra $\mathfrak{h}$ and a particular root system $\Delta$. Introducing the notation $X_n = X\otimes t^n$, one can attempt to extend a Cartan–Weyl basis $\{H^i\} \cup \{E^\alpha|\alpha \in \Delta\}$ for $\mathfrak{g}$ to one for the affine Lie algebra, given by $\{H^i_n\} \cup \{c\} \cup \{E^\alpha_n\}$, with $\{H^i_0\} \cup \{c\}$ forming an abelian subalgebra.

The eigenvalues of $\operatorname{ad}(H^i_0)$ and $\operatorname{ad}(c)$ on $E^\alpha_n$ are $\alpha^i$ and $0$ respectively and independently of $n$. Therefore the root $\alpha$ is infinitely degenerate with respect to this abelian subalgebra. Appending the derivation described above to the abelian subalgebra turns the abelian subalgebra into a Cartan subalgebra for the affine Lie algebra, with eigenvalues $(\alpha^1, \cdots, \alpha^{\dim \mathfrak{h}}, 0, n)$ for $E^\alpha_n.$

=== Killing form ===
The Killing form can almost be completely determined using its invariance property. Using the notation $B$ for the Killing form on $\mathfrak{g}$ and $\hat B$ for the Killing form on the affine Kac–Moody algebra,
$$\hat B(X_n, Y_m) = B(X,Y)\delta_{n+m,0},$$
$$\hat B(X_n, c) = 0, \hat B(X_n, d) = 0$$
$$\hat B(c, c) = 0, \hat B(c, d) = 1, \hat B(d,d) = 0,$$
where only the last equation is not fixed by invariance and instead chosen by convention. Notably, the restriction of $\hat B$ to the $c,d$ subspace gives a bilinear form with signature $(+,-)$.

Write the affine root associated with $E^\alpha_n$ as $\hat \alpha = (\alpha;0;n)$. Defining $\delta = (0,0,1)$, this can be rewritten
$$\hat \alpha = \alpha + n\delta.$$

The full set of roots is
$$\hat \Delta = \{\alpha + n\delta|n \in \mathbb Z, \alpha \in \Delta\}\cup \{n\delta|n \in \mathbb Z, n \neq 0\}.$$
Then $\delta$ is unusual as it has zero length: $(\delta, \delta) = 0$ where $(\cdot,\cdot)$ is the bilinear form on the roots induced by the Killing form.

=== Affine simple root ===
In order to obtain a basis of simple roots for the affine algebra, an extra simple root must be appended, and is given by
$$\alpha_0 = -\theta + \delta$$
where $\theta$ is the highest root of $\mathfrak{g}$, using the usual notion of height of a root. This allows definition of the extended Cartan matrix and extended Dynkin diagrams.

== Representation theory ==
The representation theory for affine Lie algebras is usually developed using Verma modules. Just as in the case of semi-simple Lie algebras, these are highest weight modules. There are no finite-dimensional representations unless c acts by 0; this follows from the fact that the null vectors of a finite-dimensional Verma module are necessarily zero; whereas those for the affine Lie algebras are not. Roughly speaking, this follows because the Killing form is Lorentzian in the $c,\delta$ directions, thus $(z, \bar{z})$ are sometimes called "lightcone coordinates" on the string. The "radially ordered" current operator products can be understood to be time-like normal ordered by taking $z=\exp(\tau + i\sigma)$ with $\tau$ the time-like direction along the string world sheet and $\sigma$ the spatial direction.

=== Vacuum representation of rank k ===
The representations are constructed in more detail as follows.

Fix a Lie algebra $\mathfrak{g}$ and basis $\{J^\rho\}$. Then $\{J^\rho_n\} = \{J^\rho \otimes t^n\}$ is a basis for the corresponding loop algebra, and $\{J^\rho_n\}\cup \{c\}$ is a basis for the affine Lie algebra $\hat \mathfrak{g}$.

The vacuum representation of rank $k$, denoted by $V_k(\mathfrak g)$ where $k \in \mathbb C$, is the complex representation with basis
$$\{v^{\, \rho_1 \, \cdots \, \rho_m}_{\, n_1 \, \cdots \, n_m}:n_1\geq \cdots \geq n_m \geq 1, \rho_1 \leq \cdots \leq \rho_m\} \cup \{\Omega\},$$
and where the action of $\hat \mathfrak{g}$ on $V = V_k(\mathfrak{g})$ is given by:
$$c = k\, \text{id}_V, \qquad J^\rho_n \Omega = 0, \ \mathrm{for} \ n \geq 0, \qquad J^\rho_{-n}\Omega = v^\rho_n, \ \mathrm{for} \ n > 0,$$
$$\mathrm{and} \ J^\rho_{-n}v^{\, \rho_1\cdots \rho_m}_{\, n_1\cdots n_m} = v^{\, \rho \, \rho_1 \cdots \rho_m}_{\, n \, n_1 \cdots n_m}.$$

=== Affine vertex algebra ===
The vacuum representation in fact can be equipped with vertex algebra structure, in which case it is called the affine vertex algebra of rank $k$. The affine Lie algebra naturally extends to the Kac–Moody algebra, with the differential $d$ represented by the translation operator $T$ in the vertex algebra.

== Weyl group and characters ==
The Weyl group of an affine Lie algebra can be written as a semi-direct product of the Weyl group of the zero-mode algebra (the Lie algebra used to define the loop algebra) and the coroot lattice.

The Weyl character formula of the algebraic characters of the affine Lie algebras generalizes to the Weyl-Kac character formula. A number of interesting constructions follow from these. One may construct generalizations of the Jacobi theta function. These theta functions transform under the modular group. The usual denominator identities of semi-simple Lie algebras generalize as well; because the characters can be written as "deformations" or q-analogs of the highest weights, this led to many new combinatoric identities, include many previously unknown identities for the Dedekind eta function. These generalizations can be viewed as a practical example of the Langlands program.

== Applications ==
Due to the Sugawara construction, the universal enveloping algebra of any affine Lie algebra has the Virasoro algebra as a subalgebra. This allows affine Lie algebras to serve as symmetry algebras of conformal field theories such as WZW models or coset models. As a consequence, affine Lie algebras also appear in the worldsheet description of string theory.

== Example ==
The Heisenberg algebra defined by generators $a_n, n \in \mathbb{Z}$ satisfying commutation relations
$$[a_m, a_n] = m\delta_{m+n,0}c$$
can be realized as the affine Lie algebra $\hat \mathfrak u(1)$.
