= Monster vertex algebra =

Vertex algebra acted on by the monster group

The monster vertex algebra (or moonshine module) is a vertex algebra acted on by the monster group that was constructed by Igor Frenkel, James Lepowsky, and Arne Meurman. R. Borcherds used it to prove the monstrous moonshine conjectures, by applying the Goddard–Thorn theorem of string theory to construct the monster Lie algebra, an infinite-dimensional generalized Kac–Moody algebra acted on by the monster.

The Griess algebra is the same as the degree 2 piece of the monster vertex algebra, and the Griess product is one of the vertex algebra products. It can be constructed as conformal field theory describing 24 free bosons compactified on the torus induced by the Leech lattice and orbifolded by the two-element reflection group.
