= Borcea (disambiguation) =

Borcea may refer to:

- Borcea, a commune in Călărași County, Romania
- Ioan Borcea (1879–1936), Romanian zoologist
  - Ion Borcea Technical College, high school in Buhuși, Romania
- Julius Borcea (1968–2009), Romanian Swedish mathematician
- Liliana Borcea, Romanian American applied mathematician
