= Borcherds =

Borcherds may refer to:

- Richard Borcherds, a British mathematician
- Borcherds, a suburb of George, South Africa
