= G-algebra =

In mathematics, a G-algebra can mean either

- An algebra over a field equipped with an algebraic representation $\pi: G \to \mathsf{Aut}(A)$.
- A G-ring that is also an associative algebra.
