= Victor Kac =

Russian mathematician

Victor Gershevich Kac
- Born: December 19, 1943 (age 82); Buguruslan, Orenburg Oblast, Russian SFSR
- Education: Moscow State University (MS); Moscow State University (PhD)
- Known for: Kac–Moody algebra; Weyl–Kac character formula; Classification of Lie superalgebras; Kac–Weisfeiler conjectures; Kac determinant formula for Virasoro algebra
- Awards: Sloan Research Fellowship (1981); Medal of the Collège de France (1981); Guggenheim Fellowship (1986); Wigner Medal (1996); American Academy of Arts and Sciences (2007); National Academy of Sciences (2013); Steele Prize (2015)
- Scientific career
- Fields: Mathematics
- Workplaces: MIT
- Thesis: Simple Irreducible Graded Lie Algebras of Finite Growth (1968)
- Doctoral advisor: Èrnest Borisovich Vinberg

Victor Gershevich (Grigorievich) Kac (Russian: Виктор Гершевич (Григорьевич) Кац; born 19 December 1943) is a Soviet and American mathematician at MIT, known for his work in representation theory. He co-discovered Kac–Moody algebras, and used the Weyl–Kac character formula for them to reprove the Macdonald identities. He classified the finite-dimensional simple Lie superalgebras, and found the Kac determinant formula for the Virasoro algebra. He is also known for the Kac–Weisfeiler conjectures with Boris Weisfeiler.

== Biography ==
Kac studied mathematics at Moscow State University, receiving his MS in 1965 and his PhD in 1968. From 1968 to 1976, he held a teaching position at the Moscow Institute of Electronic Machine Building (MIEM). He left the Soviet Union in 1977, becoming an associate professor of mathematics at MIT. In 1981, he was promoted to full professor. Kac received a Sloan Fellowship and the Medal of the Collège de France, both in 1981, and a Guggenheim Fellowship in 1986. He received the Wigner Medal (1996) "in recognition of work on affine Lie algebras that has had wide influence in theoretical physics". In 1978 he was an invited speaker (Highest weight representations of infinite dimensional Lie algebras) at the International Congress of Mathematicians (ICM) in Helsinki. Kac was a plenary speaker at the 1988 American Mathematical Society centennial conference. In 2002 he gave a plenary lecture, Classification of Supersymmetries, at the ICM in Beijing.

Kac is a Fellow of the American Mathematical Society, an honorary member of the Moscow Mathematical Society, Fellow of the American Academy of Arts and Sciences and a Member of the National Academy of Sciences.

The research of Victor Kac primarily concerns representation theory and mathematical physics. His work appears in mathematics and physics and in the development of quantum field theory, string theory and the theory of integrable systems.

Kac has published 13 books and over 200 articles in mathematics and physics journals and is listed as an ISI highly cited researcher. Victor Kac was awarded the 2015 AMS Leroy P. Steele Prize for Lifetime Achievement.

He was married with Michèle Vergne and they have a daughter, Marianne Kac-Vergne, who is a professor of American civilization at the university of Picardie. His brother Boris Katz is a principal research scientist at MIT.

== Kac–Moody algebra ==
"Almost simultaneously in 1967, Victor Kac in the USSR and Robert Moody in Canada developed what was to become Kac–Moody algebra. Kac and Moody noticed that if Wilhelm Killing's conditions were relaxed, it was still possible to associate to the Cartan matrix a Lie algebra which, necessarily, would be infinite dimensional." – A.J. Coleman

== Bibliography ==
- Kac, Victor G. (1994) [1985]. Infinite-Dimensional Lie Algebras (3rd ed.). Cambridge University Press. ISBN 0-521-46693-8.
- Kac, V. (1985). Infinite Dimensional Groups with Applications. New York: Springer. ISBN 9781461211044. OCLC 840277997.
- Seligman, George B. (1987). "Review: Infinite-dimensional Lie algebras, by Victor G. Kac, 2nd edition" (PDF). Bull. Amer. Math. Soc. (N.S.). 16: 144–149. doi:10.1090/S0273-0979-1987-15492-9.
- Kac, Victor G.; Raina, A. K. (1987). Bombay lectures on highest weight representations of infinite-dimensional Lie algebras. Singapore: World Scientific. ISBN 9971503956. OCLC 18475755.
- Kac, Victor (1997). Vertex Algebras for Beginners (University Lecture Series, No 10). American Mathematical Society. ISBN 0-8218-0643-2.
- Kac, Victor G.; Cheung, Pokman (2002). Quantum calculus. New York: Springer. ISBN 0387953418. OCLC 47243954.
- Kac, Victor G.; Raina, A. K. (2013). Bombay Lectures on Highest Weight Representations of Infinite Dimensional Lie Algebras. Advanced Series in Mathematical Physics. Vol. 29 (2nd ed.). World Scientific Publishing. doi:10.1142/8882. ISBN 978-981-4522-18-2.
