= Monster Lie algebra =

Infinite-dimensional generalized Kac-Moody algebra

In mathematics, the monster Lie algebra is an infinite-dimensional generalized Kac–Moody algebra acted on by the monster group, which was used to prove the monstrous moonshine conjectures.

== Structure ==
The monster Lie algebra is a Z^{2}-graded Lie algebra. The piece of degree (m, n) has dimension c_{mn} if (m, n) ≠ (0, 0) and dimension 2 if (m, n) = (0, 0). The integers c_{n} are the coefficients of q^{n} of the j-invariant as elliptic modular function

$$j(q) -744 = {1 \over q}  + 196884 q + 21493760 q^2 + \cdots.$$

The Cartan subalgebra is the 2-dimensional subspace of degree (0, 0), so the monster Lie algebra has rank 2.

The monster Lie algebra has just one real simple root, given by the vector (1, −1), and the Weyl group has order 2, and acts by mapping (m, n) to (n, m). The imaginary simple roots are the vectors (1, n) for n = 1, 2, 3, ..., and they have multiplicities c_{n}.

The denominator formula for the monster Lie algebra is the product formula for the j-invariant:

$$j(p) - j(q) = \left({1 \over p} - {1 \over q}\right) \prod_{n,m=1}^{\infty}(1-p^n q^m)^{c_{nm}}.$$

The denominator formula (sometimes called the Koike-Norton-Zagier infinite product identity) was discovered in the 1980s. Several mathematicians, including Masao Koike, Simon P. Norton, and Don Zagier, independently made the discovery.

== Construction ==
There are two ways to construct the monster Lie algebra. As it is a generalized Kac–Moody algebra whose simple roots are known, it can be defined by explicit generators and relations; however, this presentation does not give an action of the monster group on it.

It can also be constructed from the monster vertex algebra by using the Goddard–Thorn theorem of string theory. This construction is much harder, but also proves that the monster group acts naturally on it.
