= Integrable module =

Type of representation of a Kac–Moody algebra

In algebra, an integrable module (or integrable representation) of a Kac–Moody algebra $\mathfrak g$ (a certain infinite-dimensional Lie algebra) is a representation of $\mathfrak g$ such that (1) it is a sum of weight spaces and (2) the Chevalley generators $e_i, f_i$ of $\mathfrak g$ are locally nilpotent. For example, the adjoint representation of a Kac–Moody algebra is integrable.
