= Howard Garland =

American mathematician

Howard Garland (born 27 October 1937, in Detroit) is an American mathematician, who works on algebraic groups, Lie algebras (structure theory and representation theory), and infinite-dimensional algebras.

Garland received in 1958 his bachelor's degree from the University of Chicago, in 1959 his master's degree from Wayne State University, and in 1964 his Ph.D. from the University of California, Berkeley under S. S. Chern with thesis On the cohomology of lattices in Lie groups). As a postdoc he was in 1964–1965 an instructor at Yale University and in 1965–1966 a visiting scholar at the Institute for Advanced Study. At Yale University he became in 1966 an assistant professor, in 1969 an associate professor, and in 1973 a full professor. Garland was a visiting professor in 1969–1970 at Columbia University and in 1972–1973 at the State University of New York at Stony Brook.

In 1986 Garland, with his doctoral student Igor Frenkel and with Gregg Zuckerman, applied Feigin's theory of semi-infinite cohomology of graded Lie algebras to explain some aspects of the BRST quantization of string theory.

== Selected publications ==
- with W. C. Hsiang: Garland H, Hsiang WC (1968). "A square integrability criterion for the cohomology of arithmetic groups". Proc Natl Acad Sci U S A. 59 (2): 354–360. Bibcode:1968PNAS...59..354G. doi:10.1073/pnas.59.2.354. PMC 224677. PMID 16591605.
- with M. Goto: Garland, Howard; Goto, Morikuni (1966). "Lattices and the adjoint group of a Lie group". Trans. Amer. Math. Soc. 124 (3): 450–460. doi:10.1090/s0002-9947-1966-0199311-1. JSTOR 1994386.
- Garland, Howard (1967). "A rigidity theorem for discrete subgroups". Trans. Amer. Math. Soc. 129 (1): 1–25. doi:10.1090/s0002-9947-1967-0214102-1. JSTOR 1994361.
- with M. S. Raghunathan: Garland, H.; Raghunathan, M. S. (1970). "Fundamental domains for lattices in (R-)rank 1 semisimple Lie groups". Annals of Mathematics. 92 (2): 279–326. doi:10.2307/1970838. JSTOR 1970838.
- Garland, Howard (1971). "A finiteness theorem for $K_2$ of a number field". Annals of Mathematics. 94 (3): 534–548. doi:10.2307/1970769. JSTOR 1970769.
- Garland, Howard (1973). "P-adic curvature and the cohomology of discrete subgroups of p-adic groups". Annals of Mathematics. 97 (3): 375–423. doi:10.2307/1970829. JSTOR 1970829.
- with M. S. Raghunathan: Garland H, Raghunathan MS (1975). "A Bruhat Decomposition for the Loop Space of a Compact Group: A New Approach to Results of Bott". Proc Natl Acad Sci U S A. 72 (12): 4716–4717. Bibcode:1975PNAS...72.4716G. doi:10.1073/pnas.72.12.4716. PMC 388799. PMID 16592292.
- Garland, Howard (1978). "The arithmetic theory of loop algebras". J. Algebra. 53 (2): 480–551. doi:10.1016/0021-8693(78)90294-6.
- with I. B. Frenkel and G. J. Zuckerman: Frenkel IB, Garland H, Zuckerman GJ (1986). "Semi-Infinite Cohomology and String Theory". Proc Natl Acad Sci U S A. 83 (22): 8442–8446. Bibcode:1986PNAS...83.8442F. doi:10.1073/pnas.83.22.8442. PMC 386946. PMID 16578792.
