= Weyl character formula =

Representation theory

In mathematics, the Weyl character formula in representation theory describes the characters of irreducible representations of compact Lie groups in terms of their highest weights. It was proved by Hermann Weyl (1925, 1926a, 1926b). There is a closely related formula for the character of an irreducible representation of a semisimple Lie algebra. In Weyl's approach to the representation theory of connected compact Lie groups, the proof of the character formula is a key step in proving that every dominant integral element actually arises as the highest weight of some irreducible representation. Important consequences of the character formula are the Weyl dimension formula and the Kostant multiplicity formula.

By definition, the character $\chi$ of a representation $\pi$ of G is the trace of $\pi(g)$, as a function of a group element $g\in G$. The irreducible representations in this case are all finite-dimensional (this is part of the Peter–Weyl theorem); so the notion of trace is the usual one from linear algebra. Knowledge of the character $\chi$ of $\pi$ gives a lot of information about $\pi$ itself.

Weyl's formula is a closed formula for the character $\chi$, in terms of other objects constructed from G and its Lie algebra.

== Statement of Weyl character formula ==
The character formula can be expressed in terms of representations of complex semisimple Lie algebras or in terms of the (essentially equivalent) representation theory of compact Lie groups.

=== Complex semisimple Lie algebras ===
Let $\pi$ be an irreducible, finite-dimensional representation of a complex semisimple Lie algebra $\mathfrak{g}$. Suppose $\mathfrak{h}$ is a Cartan subalgebra of $\mathfrak{g}$. The character of $\pi$ is then the function $\operatorname{ch}_\pi : \mathfrak{h}\rightarrow \mathbb{C}$ defined by

$$\operatorname{ch}_\pi H = \operatorname{tr}(e^{\pi(H)}).$$

The value of the character at $H=0$ is the dimension of $\pi$. By elementary considerations, the character may be computed as

$$\operatorname{ch}_\pi H = \sum_{\mu}m_\mu e^{\mu(H)}$$,

where the sum ranges over all the weights $\mu$ of $\pi$ and where $m_\mu$ is the multiplicity of $\mu$. (The preceding expression is sometimes taken as the definition of the character.)

The character formula states that $\operatorname{ch}_\pi H$ may also be computed as

$$\operatorname{ch}_\pi H = \frac{\sum_{w\in W} \varepsilon(w) e^{w(\lambda+\rho)(H)}}{\prod_{\alpha \in \Delta^{+}}(e^{\alpha(H)/2}-e^{-\alpha(H)/2})}$$

where

- $W$ is the Weyl group;
- $\Delta^{+}$ is the set of the positive roots of the root system $\Delta$;
- $\rho$ is the half-sum of the positive roots, often called the Weyl vector;
- $\lambda$ is the highest weight of the irreducible representation $\pi$;
- $\varepsilon(w)$ is the determinant of the action of $w$ on the Cartan subalgebra $\mathfrak{h} \subset \mathfrak{g}$. This is equal to $(-1)^{\ell(w)}$, where $\ell(w)$ is the length of the Weyl group element, defined to be the minimal number of reflections with respect to simple roots such that $w$ equals the product of those reflections.

=== Discussion ===
Using the Weyl denominator formula (described below), the character formula may be rewritten as

$$\operatorname{ch}_\pi H = \frac{\sum_{w\in W} \varepsilon(w) e^{w(\lambda+\rho)(H)}}{\sum_{w\in W} \varepsilon(w)e^{w(\rho)(H)}}$$,

or, equivalently,

$$\operatorname{ch}_\pi(H){\sum_{w\in W} \varepsilon(w)e^{w(\rho)(H)}} =\sum_{w\in W} \varepsilon(w) e^{w(\lambda+\rho)(H)}.$$

The character is itself a large sum of exponentials. In this last expression, we then multiply the character by an alternating sum of exponentials—which seemingly will result in an even larger sum of exponentials. The surprising part of the character formula is that when we compute this product, only a small number of terms actually remain. Many more terms than this occur at least once in the product of the character and the Weyl denominator, but most of these terms cancel out to zero. The only terms that survive are the terms that occur only once, namely $e^{(\lambda+\rho)(H)}$ (which is obtained by taking the highest weight from $\operatorname{ch}_\pi$ and the highest weight from the Weyl denominator) and things in the Weyl-group orbit of $e^{(\lambda+\rho)(H)}$.

=== Compact Lie groups ===
Let $K$ be a compact, connected Lie group and let $T$ be a maximal torus in $K$. Let $\Pi$ be an irreducible representation of $K$. Then we define the character of $\Pi$ to be the function

$$\Chi(x)=\operatorname{trace}(\Pi(x)),\quad x\in K.$$

The character is easily seen to be a class function on $K$ and the Peter–Weyl theorem asserts that the characters form an orthonormal basis for the space of square-integrable class functions on $K$.

Since $\Chi$ is a class function, it is determined by its restriction to $T$. Now, for $H$ in the Lie algebra $\mathfrak t$ of $T$, we have

$$\operatorname{trace}(\Pi(e^H))=\operatorname{trace}(e^{\pi(H)})$$,

where $\pi$ is the associated representation of the Lie algebra $\mathfrak k$ of $K$. Thus, the function $H\mapsto \operatorname{trace}(\Pi(e^H))$ is simply the character of the associated representation $\pi$ of $\mathfrak k$, as described in the previous subsection. The restriction of the character of $\Pi$ to $T$ is then given by the same formula as in the Lie algebra case:

$$\Chi(e^H)=\frac{\sum_{w\in W} \varepsilon(w) e^{w(\lambda+\rho)(H)}}{\sum_{w\in W} \varepsilon(w)e^{w(\rho)(H)}}.$$

Weyl's proof of the character formula in the compact group setting is completely different from the algebraic proof of the character formula in the setting of semisimple Lie algebras. In the compact group setting, it is common to use "real roots" and "real weights", which differ by a factor of $i$ from the roots and weights used here. Thus, the formula in the compact group setting has factors of $i$ in the exponent throughout.

=== The SU(2) case ===
In the case of the group SU(2), consider the irreducible representation of dimension $m+1$. If we take $T$ to be the diagonal subgroup of SU(2), the character formula in this case reads

$$\Chi\left(\begin{pmatrix}
e^{i\theta} & 0\\
0 & e^{-i\theta}
\end{pmatrix}\right)=\frac{e^{i(m+1)\theta}-e^{-i(m+1)\theta}}{e^{i\theta}-e^{-i\theta}} =\frac{\sin((m+1)\theta)}{\sin\theta}.$$

(Both numerator and denominator in the character formula have two terms.) It is instructive to verify this formula directly in this case, so that we can observe the cancellation phenomenon implicit in the Weyl character formula.

Since the representations are known very explicitly, the character of the representation can be written down as

$$\Chi\left(\begin{pmatrix}
e^{i\theta} & 0\\
0 & e^{-i\theta}
\end{pmatrix}\right) = e^{im\theta}+e^{i(m-2)\theta}+\cdots +e^{-im\theta}.$$

The Weyl denominator, meanwhile, is simply the function $e^{i\theta}-e^{-i\theta}$. Multiplying the character by the Weyl denominator gives

$$\Chi\left(\begin{pmatrix}
e^{i\theta} & 0\\
0 & e^{-i\theta}
\end{pmatrix}\right) (e^{i\theta}-e^{-i\theta})=\left( e^{i(m+1)\theta}+e^{i(m-1)\theta}+\cdots +e^{-i(m-1)\theta}\right)-\left( e^{i(m-1)\theta}+\cdots+e^{-i(m-1)\theta}+e^{-i(m+1)\theta}\right).$$

We can now easily verify that most of the terms cancel between the two term on the right-hand side above, leaving us with only

$$\Chi\left(\begin{pmatrix}
e^{i\theta} & 0\\
0 & e^{-i\theta}
\end{pmatrix}\right) (e^{i\theta}-e^{-i\theta})=e^{i(m+1)\theta}-e^{-i(m+1)\theta}$$

so that

$$\Chi\left(\begin{pmatrix}
e^{i\theta} & 0\\
0 & e^{-i\theta}
\end{pmatrix}\right)=\frac{e^{i(m+1)\theta}-e^{-i(m+1)\theta}}{e^{i\theta}-e^{-i\theta}} =\frac{\sin((m+1)\theta)}{\sin\theta}.$$

The character in this case is a geometric series with $R=e^{2i\theta}$ and that preceding argument is a small variant of the standard derivation of the formula for the sum of a finite geometric series.

== Weyl denominator formula ==
In the special case of the trivial 1-dimensional representation the character is 1, so the Weyl character formula becomes the Weyl denominator formula:

$${\sum_{w\in W} \varepsilon(w)e^{w(\rho)(H)} = \prod_{\alpha \in \Delta^{+}}(e^{\alpha(H)/2}-e^{-\alpha(H)/2})}.$$

For special unitary groups, this is equivalent to the expression

$$\sum_{\sigma \in S_n} \sgn(\sigma) \, X_1^{\sigma(1)-1} \cdots X_n^{\sigma(n)-1} =\prod_{1\le i<j\le n} (X_j-X_i)$$

for the Vandermonde determinant.

== Weyl dimension formula ==
By evaluating the character at $H=0$, Weyl's character formula gives the Weyl dimension formula

$$\dim V_\lambda = {\prod_{\alpha \in \Delta^{+}}(\lambda+\rho,\alpha) \over \prod_{\alpha \in \Delta^{+}}(\rho,\alpha)}$$

for the dimension of a finite-dimensional representation $V_\lambda$ with highest weight $\lambda$. (As usual, ρ is half the sum of the positive roots and the products run over positive roots α.) The specialization is not completely trivial, because both the numerator and denominator of the Weyl character formula vanish to high order at the identity element, so it is necessary to take a limit of the trace of an element tending to the identity, using a version of L'Hôpital's rule. In the SU(2) case described above, for example, we can recover the dimension $m+1$ of the representation by using L'Hôpital's rule to evaluate the limit as $\theta$ tends to zero of $\sin((m+1)\theta)/\sin\theta$.

We may consider as an example the complex semisimple Lie algebra sl(3,C), or equivalently the compact group SU(3). In that case, the representations are labeled by a pair $(m_1,m_2)$ of non-negative integers. In this case, there are three positive roots and it is not hard to verify that the dimension formula takes the explicit form

$$\dim V_{m_1,m_2} = \frac{1}{2}(m_1+1)(m_2+1)(m_1+m_2+2)$$

The case $m_1=1,\,m_2=0$ is the standard representation, and indeed the dimension formula gives the value 3 in this case.

== Kostant multiplicity formula ==
The Weyl character formula gives the character of each representation as a quotient, where the numerator and denominator are each a finite linear combination of exponentials. While this formula in principle determines the character, it is not especially obvious how one can compute this quotient explicitly as a finite sum of exponentials. Already in the SU(2) case described above, it is not immediately obvious how to go from the Weyl character formula, which gives the character as $\sin((m+1)\theta)/\sin\theta$, back to the formula for the character as a sum of exponentials:

$$e^{im\theta}+e^{i(m-2)\theta}+\cdots+e^{-im\theta}.$$

In this case, it is perhaps not terribly difficult to recognize the expression $\sin((m+1)\theta) / \sin\theta$ as the sum of a finite geometric series, but in general we need a more systematic procedure.

In general, the division process can be accomplished by computing a formal reciprocal of the Weyl denominator and then multiplying the numerator in the Weyl character formula by this formal reciprocal. The result gives the character as a finite sum of exponentials. The coefficients of this expansion are the dimensions of the weight spaces, that is, the multiplicities of the weights. We thus obtain from the Weyl character formula a formula for the multiplicities of the weights, known as the Kostant multiplicity formula. An alternative formula, that is more computationally tractable in some cases, is given in the next section.

== Freudenthal's formula ==
Hans Freudenthal's formula is a recursive formula for the weight multiplicities that gives the same answer as the Kostant multiplicity formula, but is sometimes easier to use for calculations as there can be far fewer terms to sum. The formula is based on use of the Casimir element and its derivation is independent of the character formula. It states

$$(\|\Lambda+\rho\|^2 - \|\lambda+\rho\|^2)m_\Lambda(\lambda)
= 2 \sum_{\alpha \in \Delta^{+}}\sum_{j\ge 1} (\lambda+j\alpha, \alpha)m_\Lambda(\lambda+j\alpha)$$

where

- $\Lambda$ is a highest weight,
- $\lambda$ is some other weight,
- $m_{\Lambda}(\lambda)$ is the multiplicity of the weight $\lambda$ in the irreducible representation $V_{\Lambda}$
- $\rho$ is the Weyl vector
- The first sum is over all positive roots $\alpha$.

== Weyl–Kac character formula ==
The Weyl character formula also holds for integrable highest-weight representations of Kac–Moody algebras, when it is known as the Weyl–Kac character formula. Similarly there is a denominator identity for Kac–Moody algebras, which in the case of the affine Lie algebras is equivalent to the Macdonald identities. In the simplest case of the affine Lie algebra of type A_{1} this is the Jacobi triple product identity

$$\prod_{m=1}^\infty
\left( 1 - x^{2m}\right)
\left( 1 - x^{2m-1} y\right)
\left( 1 - x^{2m-1} y^{-1}\right)
= \sum_{n=-\infty}^\infty (-1)^n x^{n^2} y^n.$$

The character formula can also be extended to integrable highest weight representations of generalized Kac–Moody algebras, when the character is given by

$${\sum_{w\in W} (-1)^{\ell(w)}w(e^{\lambda+\rho}S) \over e^{\rho}\prod_{\alpha \in \Delta^{+}}(1-e^{-\alpha})}.$$

Here S is a correction term given in terms of the imaginary simple roots by

$$S=\sum_I (-1)^{|I|}e^{\Sigma I} \,$$

where the sum runs over all finite subsets I of the imaginary simple roots which are pairwise orthogonal and orthogonal to the highest weight λ, and |I| is the cardinality of I and ΣI is the sum of the elements of I.

The denominator formula for the monster Lie algebra is the product formula

$$j(p)-j(q) = \left({1 \over p} - {1 \over q}\right) \prod_{n,m=1}^\infty (1-p^n q^m)^{c_{nm}}$$

for the elliptic modular function j.

Peterson gave a recursion formula for the multiplicities mult(β) of the roots β of a symmetrizable (generalized) Kac–Moody algebra, which is equivalent to the Weyl–Kac denominator formula, but easier to use for calculations:

$$(\beta,\beta-2\rho)c_\beta = \sum_{\gamma+\delta=\beta} (\gamma,\delta)c_\gamma c_\delta \,$$

where the sum is over positive roots γ, δ, and

$$c_\beta = \sum_{n\ge 1} {\operatorname{mult}(\beta/n)\over n}.$$

== Harish-Chandra Character Formula ==
Harish-Chandra showed that Weyl's character formula admits a generalization to representations of a real, reductive group. Suppose $\pi$ is an irreducible, admissible representation of a real, reductive group G with infinitesimal character $\lambda$. Let $\Theta_{\pi}$ be the Harish-Chandra character of $\pi$; it is given by integration against an analytic function on the regular set. If H is a Cartan subgroup of G and H′ is the set of regular elements in H, then

$$\Theta_{\pi}|_{H'} = {\sum_{w\in W/W_{\lambda}} a_w e^{w\lambda} \over e^{\rho}\prod_{\alpha \in \Delta^{+}}(1-e^{-\alpha})}.$$

Here

- $W$ is the complex Weyl group of $H_{\mathbb{C}}$ with respect to $G_{\mathbb{C}}$
- $W_{\lambda}$ is the stabilizer of $\lambda$ in $W$

and the rest of the notation is as above.

The coefficients $a_w$ are still not well understood. Results on these coefficients may be found in papers of Herb, Adams, Schmid, and Schmid-Vilonen among others.

== See also ==
- Character theory
- Algebraic character
- Demazure character formula
- Weyl integration formula
- Kirillov character formula
