= Pavel Etingof =

American mathematician

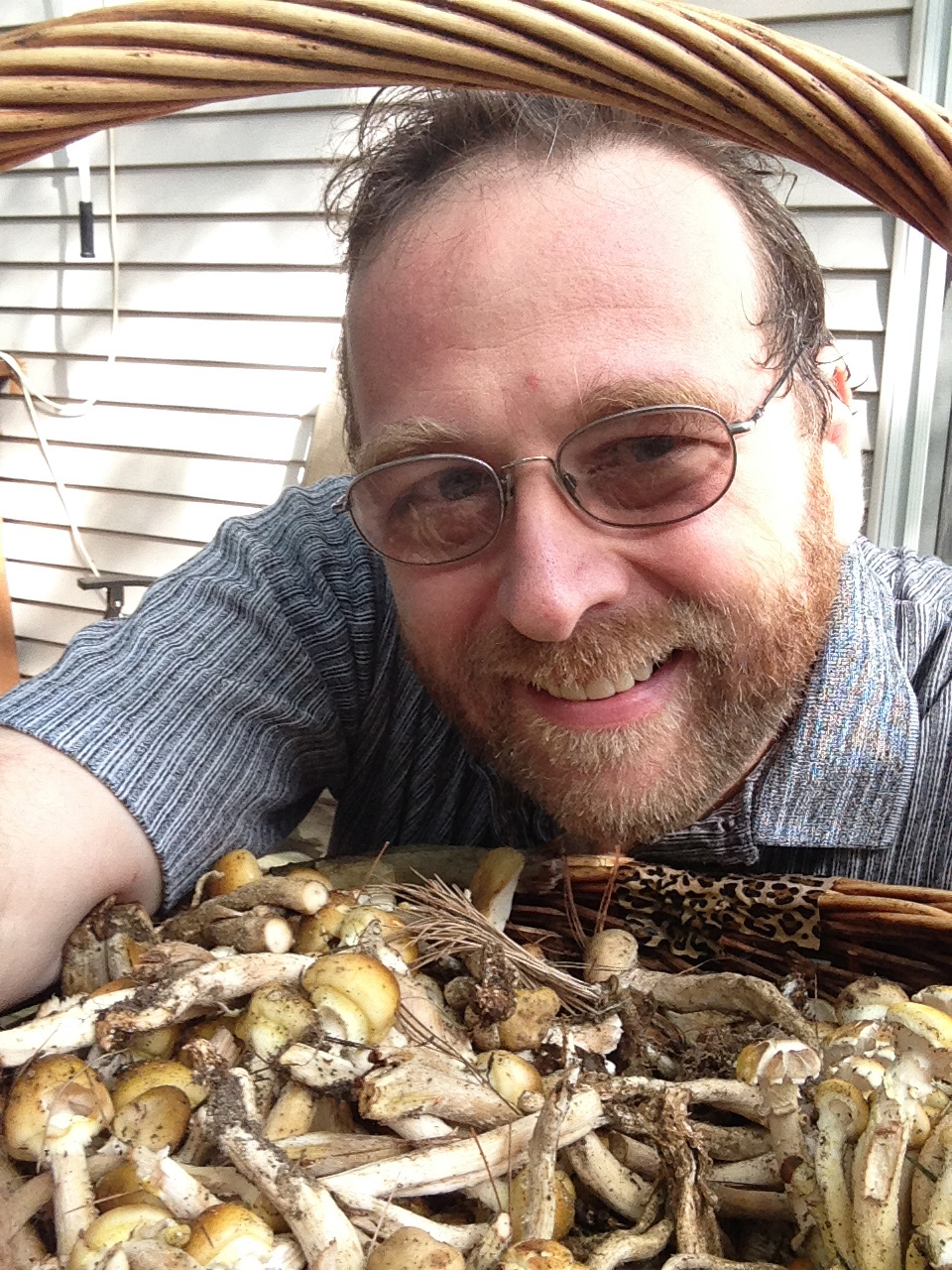
- Born: 1969 (age 56–57); Kyiv, Ukrainian SSR
- Education: Yale University
- Awards: Fellow, American Mathematical Society (2012); AAAS Fellow (2016)
- Scientific career
- Fields: Mathematics
- Workplaces: MIT
- Thesis: Representation theory and holonomic Systems (1994)
- Doctoral advisor: Igor Frenkel
- Website: math.mit.edu/~etingof/

Pavel Ilyich Etingof (Ukrainian: Павло Ілліч Етінгоф, Russian: Павел Ильич Этингоф; born 1969) is an American mathematician of Ukrainian origin. He does research on the intersection of mathematical physics (exactly integrable systems) and representation theory, e.g., quantum groups.

== Biography ==
Etingof was born in Kyiv, Ukrainian SSR, and studied in the Kyiv Natural Science Lyceum No. 145 in 1981–1984, and at the Department of Mathematics and Mechanics of the Taras Shevchenko National University of Kyiv in 1984–1986. He received his M.S. in applied mathematics from the Oil and Gas Institute in Moscow in 1989 and then went to the US in 1990. In 1994, he received his PhD in mathematics at Yale University under Igor Frenkel with thesis Representation Theory and Holonomic Systems. After his PhD, he became Benjamin Peirce Assistant Professor at Harvard University and in 1998 an assistant professor at MIT. Since 2005 he is a professor at MIT.

In 1999, he was a Fellow of the Clay Mathematics Institute.

In 2002, he was an invited speaker at the International Congress of Mathematicians in Beijing (On the dynamical Yang–Baxter equation). He is a Fellow of the American Mathematical Society.

In 2010, together with Slava Gerovitch he co-founded the MIT Program for Research In Mathematics, Engineering and Science (PRIMES) for high school students, and has since served as its Chief Research Advisor.

In 2016, he became a fellow of the American Academy of Arts and Sciences.

== Books ==
- Quantum fields and strings: a course for mathematicians. Vol. 1, 2. Material from the Special Year on Quantum Field Theory held at the Institute for Advanced Study, Princeton, NJ, 1996–1997. Edited by Pierre Deligne, Pavel Etingof, Daniel S. Freed, Lisa C. Jeffrey, David Kazhdan, John W. Morgan, David R. Morrison and Edward Witten. American Mathematical Society, Providence, RI; Institute for Advanced Study (IAS), Princeton, NJ, 1999. Vol. 1: xxii+723 pp.; Vol. 2: pp. i--xxiv and 727–1501. ISBN 0-8218-1198-3, 81-06 (81T30 81Txx)
- With Frédéric Latour: The dynamical Yang–Baxter equation, representation theory, and quantum integrable systems, Oxford University Press 2005
- With Igor Frenkel, Alexander Kirillov, Jr.: Lectures on representation theory and Knizhnik–Zamolodchikov equations, American Mathematical Society 1998
- With Alexander Varchenko: Why the boundary of a round drop becomes a curve of order four, American Mathematical Society 1992ISBN 978-0-8218-7002-0
- Calogero–Moser Systems and Representation Theory, European Mathematical Society 2007 (Zürich Lecture Notes in Advanced Mathematics)
- With co-authors: Introduction to Representation theory, Student Mathematical Library, American Mathematical Society 2011
- Editor with co-editors: The unity of mathematics: in honor of the ninetieth birthday of I. M. Gelfand, Birkhäuser 2006
- Editor with Shlomo Gelaki and Steven Shnider: Quantum Groups (Konferenz Technion 2004), American Mathematical Society 2007
- Tensor Categories. American Mathematical Society. 2015. ISBN 978-1-4704-2024-6.
