= Katrina Barron =

American mathematician

Katrina Deane Barron (born 1965) is an American mathematician and mathematical physicist whose research concerns vertex operator algebras. She is an associate professor of mathematics at the University of Notre Dame.

== Education and career ==
Barron has a bachelor's degree from the University of Chicago: a 1987 Honors B.A. in Physics with General Honors in the College and fulfilled the requirements for a B.S. in Mathematics. She completed her Ph.D. at Rutgers University in 1996, with the dissertation The Supergeometric Interpretation of Vertex Operator Superalgebras, jointly supervised by James Lepowsky and Yi-Zhi Huang.

Before becoming an associate professor of mathematics at the University of Notre Dame in 2001, she was a postdoctoral researcher with Geoffrey Mason at the University of California, Santa Cruz, supported by a University of California Presidential Postdoctoral Fellowship and a National Sciences Foundation Postdoctoral Fellowship.

== Recognition ==
Barron was named as a Fellow of the Association for Women in Mathematics, in the 2025 class of fellows, "for her tireless advocacy for gender equality, mentorship of women in algebra, representation theory, and mathematical physics, and active participation and leadership in initiatives aimed at supporting women in mathematics".
