= Julius Borcea =

Romanian Swedish mathematician

Julius Bogdan Borcea
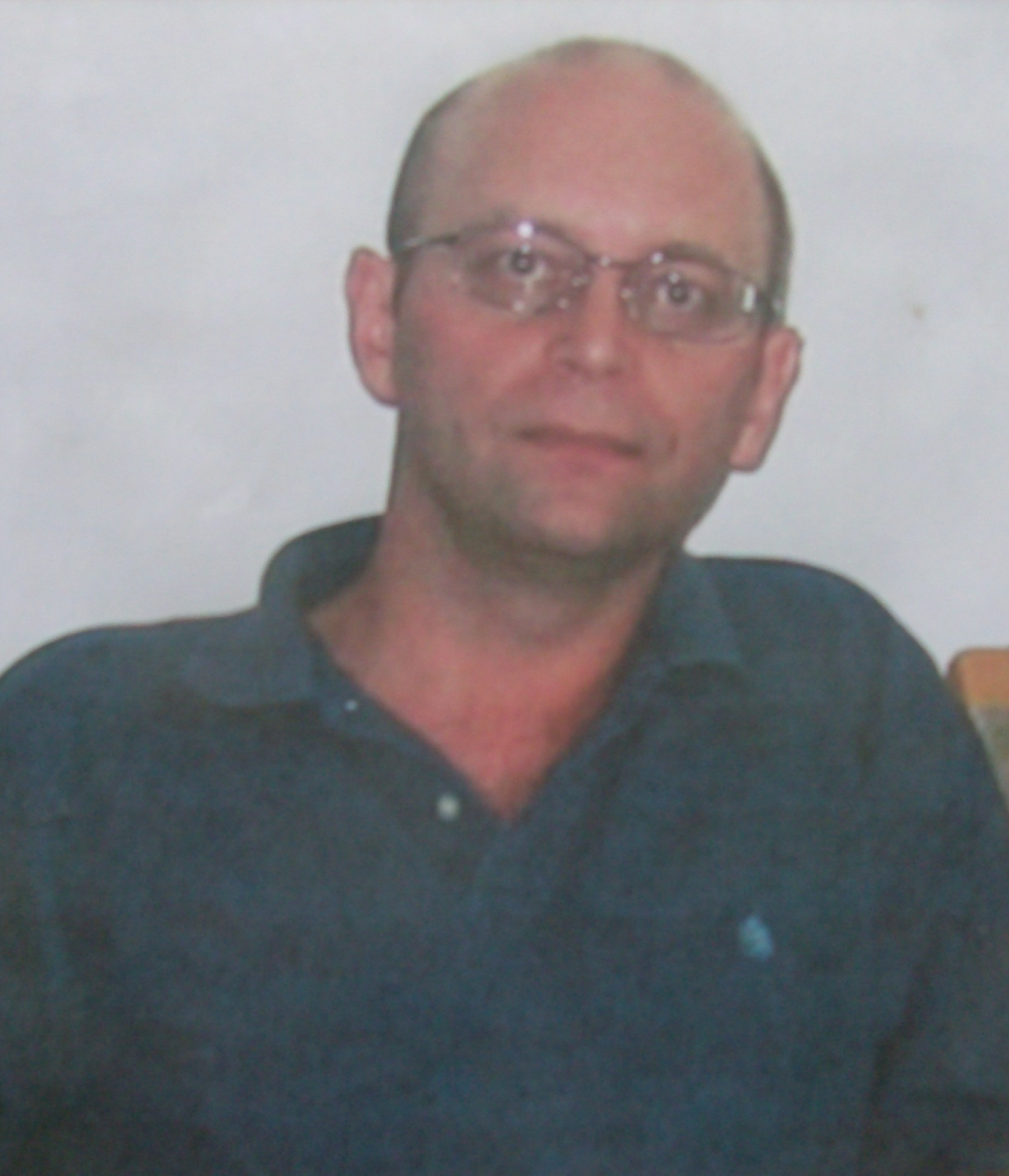
- Born: 8 June 1968; Bacău, Romania
- Died: 8 April 2009 (aged 40); Stockholm, Sweden
- Education: Lund University
- Awards: Swedish Mathematical Society Wallenberg Prize, 2004
- Scientific career
- Fields: Mathematician
- Workplaces: Stockholm University
- Doctoral advisor: Arne Meurman

Julius Bogdan Borcea (8 June 1968 – 8 April 2009) was a Romanian Swedish mathematician. His scientific work included vertex operator algebra and zero distribution of polynomials and entire functions, via correlation inequalities and statistical mechanics.

== Biography ==
Born in Bacău, Romania, by a math teacher who instilled in her son's intellect the beauty of mathematics, he studied in 1982-1984 at the Lycée Descartes in Rabat, Morocco, and he completed his Baccalaureat at the Lycée Français Prins Henrik of Copenhagen. In 1987–1989 he attended the Lycée Louis-le-Grand in Paris. He obtained his PhD in Mathematics in 1998, at Lund University, under the direction of Arne Meurman. After defending his PhD thesis in 1998, he embarked in postdoctoral studies at the Mittag-Leffler Institute for six months and at the University of Strasbourg for two years. He was appointed Associate Professor in 2001, and Lecturer in 2005 at Stockholm University. A year later he was granted the Swedish Mathematical Society's Wallenberg Prize. Promoted to Full Professor in 2008, he was awarded a Royal Swedish Academy of Sciences Fellowship, in 2009, and the Crafoord prize research grant diploma.

== Professional profile ==
Borcea's scientific work ranged from vertex operator theory to zero distribution of polynomials and entire functions, via correlation inequalities and statistical mechanics. His thesis consists of two seemingly independent parts: one in vertex operator theory and the other devoted to the geometry of zeros of complex polynomials in one variable.

In vertex operator theory, Julius generalized results of Mirko Primc and Arne Meurman and gave a classification of annihilated fields. As concerns complex polynomials, he tackled Sendov’s conjecture on zeros and critical points of complex polynomials in one variable. Using novel techniques, he proved the conjecture for polynomials of degree not exceeding 7. Earlier (1969) the conjecture had been proven for polynomials of degree not exceeding 5. At Stockholm University, Julius had a steady collaboration with Rikard Bøgvad and Boris Shapiro. They worked on rational approximations of algebraic equations, piecewise harmonic functions and positive Cauchy transforms, and the geometry of zeros of polynomials in one variable. Borcea and Petter Brändén collaborated on a project on the geometry of zeros of polynomials and entire functions. They characterized all linear operators on polynomials preserving the property of having only real zeros, a problem that goes back to Edmond Laguerre and to George Pólya and Issai Schur. These results were subsequently extended to several variables, and a connection to the Lee–Yang theorem on phase-transitions in statistical physics was made. Together with Tom Liggett (UCLA) they applied their methods to problems in probability theory and were able to prove an important conjecture about the preservation of negative dependence properties in the symmetric exclusion process.

Borcea had a comprehensive project on the distribution of positive charges and the Hausdorff geometry of complex polynomials. One of the motivations for the project was to bring Sendov’s conjecture into a larger and more natural context. He formulated several interesting conjectures, and in the summer of 2008 he was the driving force of two meetings, one at the American Institute of Mathematics in San Jose, California and the other at the Banff International Research Station together with Dmitry Khavinson, Rajesh Pereira, Mihai Putinar, Edward B. Saff, and Serguei Shimorin. These two encounters were focused on structuring and expanding Julius’ program. His continuous and vivid interest in the Hausdorff geometry of polynomials was triggered by an École normale supérieure (Paris) exam he took in 1989.

== Publications ==
- Borcea, Julius; Friedland, Shmuel; Shapiro, Boris (2011). "Parametric Poincaré–Perron theorem with applications". Journal d'Analyse Mathématique. 113: 197–225. CiteSeerX 10.1.1.216.1388. doi:10.1007/s11854-011-0004-0. MR 2788356. S2CID 3298201.
- Borcea, Julius (2011). "Classifications of linear operators preserving elliptic, positive and non-negative polynomials". Journal für die reine und angewandte Mathematik. 2011 (650): 67–82. arXiv:0811.4374. doi:10.1515/crelle.2011.003. MR 2770556. S2CID 14323620.
- Borcea, Julius; Brändén, Petter (2010). "Multivariate Pólya-Schur classification problems in the Weyl algebra". Proceedings of the London Mathematical Society. 3. 101 (1): 73–104. arXiv:math/0606360. doi:10.1112/plms/pdp049. MR 2661242. S2CID 15829234.
- Borcea, Julius; Brändén, Petter, Hyperbolicity preservers and majorization. C. R. Math. Acad. Sci. Paris 348 (2010), no. 15-16, 843–846.
- Borcea, Julius; Brändén, Petter, The Lee-Yang and Pólya-Schur programs. II. Theory of stable polynomials and applications. Comm. Pure Appl. Math. 62 (2009), no. 12, 1595–1631.
- Borcea, Julius; Brändén, Petter, The Lee-Yang and Pólya-Schur programs. I. Linear operators preserving stability. Inventiones Mathematicae 177 (2009), no. 3, 541–569.
- Borcea, Julius; Brändén, Petter, Pólya-Schur master theorems for circular domains and their boundaries. Annals of Mathematics (2) 170 (2009), no. 1, 465–492.
- Borcea, Julius; Bøgvad, Rikard; Shapiro, Boris, Homogenized spectral problems for exactly solvable operators: asymptotics of polynomial eigenfunctions. Publ. Res. Inst. Math. Sci. 45 (2009), no. 2, 525–568.
- Borcea, Julius; Bøgvad, Rikard, Piecewise harmonic subharmonic functions and positive Cauchy transforms. Pacific J. Math. 240 (2009), no. 2, 231–265.
- Borcea, Julius; Brändén, Petter; Liggett, Thomas M., Negative dependence and the geometry of polynomials. J. Amer. Math. Soc. 22 (2009), no. 2, 521–567.
- Borcea, Julius; Brändén, Petter, Lee-Yang problems and the geometry of multivariate polynomials. Lett. Math. Phys. 86 (2008), no. 1, 53–61.
- Borcea, Julius; Shapiro, Boris, Root asymptotics of spectral polynomials for the Lamé operator. Comm. Math. Phys. 282 (2008), no. 2, 323–337.
- Borcea, Julius, Convexity properties of twisted root maps. Rocky Mountain J. Math. 38 (2008), no. 3, 809–833.
- Borcea, Julius; Brändén, Petter, Applications of stable polynomials to mixed determinants: Johnson's conjectures, unimodality, and symmetrized Fischer products. Duke Math. J. 143 (2008), no. 2, 205–223.
- Borcea, Julius, Choquet order for spectra of higher Lamé operators and orthogonal polynomials. J. Approx. Theory 151 (2008), no. 2, 164–180.
- Borcea, Julius, Equilibrium points of logarithmic potentials induced by positive charge distributions. I. Generalized de Bruijn-Springer relations. Trans. Amer. Math. Soc. 359 (2007), no. 7, 3209–3237 (electronic).
- Borcea, Julius, Spectral order and isotonic differential operators of Laguerre-Pólya type. Ark. Mat. 44 (2006), no. 2, 211–240.
- Borcea, Julius, Maximal and linearly inextensible polynomials. Math. Scand. 99 (2006), no. 1, 53–75.
- Borcea, Julius; Bøgvad, Rikard; Shapiro, Boris, On rational approximation of algebraic functions. Advances in Mathematics 204 (2006), no. 2, 448–480.
- Borcea, Julius; Shapiro, Boris, Classifying real polynomial pencils. Int. Math. Res. Not. 2004, no. 69, 3689–3708.
- Borcea, Julius; Shapiro, Boris, Hyperbolic polynomials and spectral order. C. R. Math. Acad. Sci. Paris 337 (2003), no. 11, 693–698.
- Borcea, Julius, Dualities and vertex operator algebras of affine type. J. Algebra 258 (2002), no. 2, 389–441.
- Borcea, Julius, Annihilating fields of standard modules for affine Lie algebras. Math. Z. 237 (2001), no. 2, 301–319.
- Borcea, Julius, Two approaches to Sendov's conjecture. Arch. Math. (Basel) 71 (1998), no. 1, 46–54.
- Borcea, Iulius, The Sendov conjecture for polynomials with at most seven distinct zeros. Analysis 16 (1996), no. 2, 137–159.
- Borcea, Iulius, On the Sendov conjecture for polynomials with at most six distinct roots. J. Math. Anal. Appl. 200 (1996), no. 1, 182–206.
