= Weyl integration formula =

Mathematical formula

In mathematics, the Weyl integration formula, introduced by Hermann Weyl, is an integration formula for a compact connected Lie group G in terms of a maximal torus T. Precisely, it says there exists a real-valued continuous function u on T such that for every class function f on G (function invariant under conjugation by $G$):

$$\int_G f(g) \, dg = \int_T f(t) u(t) \, dt.$$

Moreover, $u$ is explicitly given as: $u = |\delta |^2 / \# W$ where $W = N_G(T)/T$ is the Weyl group determined by T and

$$\delta(t) = \prod_{\alpha > 0} \left( e^{\alpha(t)/2} - e^{-\alpha(t)/2} \right),$$

the product running over the positive roots of G relative to T. More generally, if $f$ is an arbitrary integrable function, then

$$\int_G f(g) \, dg = \int_T \left( \int_{G/T} f(gtg^{-1}) \, d(gT) \right) u(t) \, dt.$$

Note that the inner integral is over the manifold $G/T$, the quotient of the group $G$ over the maximal torus $T$, and $d(gT)$ is some Borel measure on this manifold.

The formula can be used to derive the Weyl character formula. (The theory of Verma modules, on the other hand, gives a purely algebraic derivation of the Weyl character formula.)

== Derivation ==
Consider the map

$$q : G/T \times T \to G, \, (gT, t) \mapsto gtg^{-1}$$.

The Weyl group W acts on T by conjugation and on $G/T$ from the left by: for $nT \in W$,

$$nT(gT) = gn^{-1} T.$$

Let $G/T \times_W T$ be the quotient space by this W-action. Then, since the W-action on $G/T$ is free, the quotient map

$$p: G/T \times T \to G/T \times_W T$$

is a smooth covering with fiber W when it is restricted to regular points. Now, $q$ is $p$ followed by $G/T \times_W T \to G$ and the latter is a homeomorphism on regular points and so has degree one. Hence, the degree of $q$ is $\# W$ and, by the change of variable formula, we get:

$$\# W \int_G f \, dg = \int_{G/T \times T} q^*(f \, dg).$$

Here, $q^*(f \, dg)|_{(gT, t)} = f(t) q^*(dg)|_{(gT, t)}$ since $f$ is a class function. We next compute $q^*(dg)|_{(gT, t)}$. We identify a tangent space to $G/T \times T$ as $\mathfrak{g}/\mathfrak{t} \oplus \mathfrak{t}$ where $\mathfrak{g}, \mathfrak{t}$ are the Lie algebras of $G, T$. For each $v \in T$,

$$q(gv, t) = gvtv^{-1}g^{-1}$$

and thus, on $\mathfrak{g}/\mathfrak{t}$, we have:

$$d(gT \mapsto q(gT, t))(\dot v) = gtg^{-1}(gt^{-1} \dot v t g^{-1} - g \dot v g^{-1}) = (\operatorname{Ad}(g) \circ (\operatorname{Ad}(t^{-1}) - I))(\dot v).$$

Similarly we see, on $\mathfrak{t}$, $d(t \mapsto q(gT, t)) = \operatorname{Ad}(g)$. Now, we can view G as a connected subgroup of an orthogonal group (as it is compact connected) and thus $\det(\operatorname{Ad}(g)) = 1$. Hence,

$$q^*(dg) = \det(\operatorname{Ad}_{\mathfrak{g}/\mathfrak{t}}(t^{-1}) - I_{\mathfrak{g}/\mathfrak{t}})\, dg.$$

To compute the determinant, we recall that $\mathfrak{g}_{\mathbb{C}} = \mathfrak{t}_{\mathbb{C}} \oplus \bigoplus_\alpha \mathfrak{g}_\alpha$ where $\mathfrak{g}_{\alpha} = \{ x \in \mathfrak{g}_{\mathbb{C}} \mid \operatorname{Ad}(t) x = e^{\alpha(t)} x, t \in T \}$ and each $\mathfrak{g}_\alpha$ has dimension one. Hence, considering the eigenvalues of $\operatorname{Ad}_{\mathfrak{g}/\mathfrak{t}}(t^{-1})$, we get:

$$\det(\operatorname{Ad}_{\mathfrak{g}/\mathfrak{t}}(t^{-1}) - I_{\mathfrak{g}/\mathfrak{t}}) = \prod_{\alpha > 0} (e^{-\alpha(t)} - 1)(e^{\alpha(t)} - 1) = \delta(t) \overline{\delta(t)},$$

as each root $\alpha$ has pure imaginary value.

== Weyl character formula ==
The Weyl character formula is a consequence of the Weyl integral formula as follows. We first note that $W$ can be identified with a subgroup of $\operatorname{GL}(\mathfrak{t}_{\mathbb{C}}^*)$; in particular, it acts on the set of roots, linear functionals on $\mathfrak{t}_{\mathbb{C}}$. Let

$$A_{\mu} = \sum_{w \in W} (-1)^{l(w)} e^{w(\mu)}$$

where $l(w)$ is the length of w. Let $\Lambda$ be the weight lattice of G relative to T. The Weyl character formula then says that: for each irreducible character $\chi$ of $G$, there exists a $\mu \in \Lambda$ such that

$$\chi|T \cdot \delta = A_{\mu}$$.

To see this, we first note

1. $\|\chi \|^2 = \int_G |\chi|^2 dg = 1.$
2. $\chi|T \cdot \delta \in \mathbb{Z}[\Lambda].$

The property (1) is precisely (a part of) the orthogonality relations on irreducible characters.
