= Algebraic representation =

Group representation via algebra automorphisms

In mathematics, an algebraic representation of a group G on a k-algebra A is a linear representation $\pi: G \to GL(A)$ such that, for each g in G, $\pi(g)$ is an algebra automorphism. Equipped with such a representation, the algebra A is then called a G-algebra.

For example, if V is a linear representation of a group G, then the representation put on the tensor algebra $T(A)$ is an algebraic representation of G.

If A is a commutative G-algebra, then $\operatorname{Spec}(A)$ is an affine G-scheme.

== See also ==
- Algebraic character
