= Harish-Chandra character =

In mathematics, the Harish-Chandra character, named after Harish-Chandra, of a representation of a semisimple Lie group G on a Hilbert space H is a distribution on the group G that is analogous to the character of a finite-dimensional representation of a compact group.

== Definition ==
Suppose that π is an irreducible unitary representation of G on a Hilbert space H. If f is a compactly supported smooth function on the group G, then the operator on H

$$\pi(f) = \int_Gf(x)\pi(x)\,dx$$

is of trace class, and the distribution

$$\Theta_\pi:f\mapsto \operatorname{Tr}(\pi(f))$$

is called the character (or global character or Harish-Chandra character) of the representation.

The character Θ_{π} is a distribution on G that is invariant under conjugation, and is an eigendistribution of the center of the universal enveloping algebra of G, in other words an invariant eigendistribution, with eigenvalue the infinitesimal character of the representation π.

Harish-Chandra's regularity theorem states that any invariant eigendistribution, and in particular any character of an irreducible unitary representation on a Hilbert space, is given by a locally integrable function.
