= Igor Frenkel =

Russian-American mathematician

- Born: 22 April 1952 (age 74); Leningrad, Soviet Union (present-day Russia)
- Citizenship: American
- Education: Saint Petersburg State University; Yale University
- Scientific career
- Fields: Mathematics
- Workplaces: Yale University
- Doctoral advisor: Howard Garland
- Doctoral students: Pavel Etingof; Mikhail Khovanov; Alexander Kirillov, Jr.

Igor Borisovich Frenkel (Russian: Игорь Борисович Френкель; born 22 April 1952) is a Russian-American mathematician at Yale University working in representation theory and mathematical physics.

Frenkel emigrated to the United States in 1979. He received his PhD from Yale University in 1980 with a dissertation on the "Orbital Theory for Affine Lie Algebras". He held positions at the IAS and MSRI, and a tenured professorship at Rutgers University, before taking his current job of tenured professor at Yale University. He was elected to the National Academy of Sciences in 2018. He is also a Fellow of the American Academy of Arts and Sciences.

== Mathematical work ==
In collaboration with James Lepowsky and Arne Meurman, he constructed the monster vertex algebra, a vertex algebra which provides a representation of the monster group.

Around 1990, as a member of the School of Mathematics at the Institute for Advanced Study, Frenkel worked on the mathematical theory of knots, hoping to develop a theory in which the knot would be seen as a physical object. He continued to develop the idea with his student Mikhail Khovanov, and their collaboration ultimately led to the discovery of Khovanov homology, a refinement of the Jones polynomial, in 2002.

A detailed description of Igor Frenkel's research over the years can be found in "Perspectives in Representation Theory".
