= Generalized Kac–Moody algebra =

Lie algebra with imaginary simple roots

In mathematics, a generalized Kac–Moody algebra is a Lie algebra that is similar to a Kac–Moody algebra, except that it is allowed to have imaginary simple roots. Generalized Kac–Moody algebras are also sometimes called GKM algebras, Borcherds–Kac–Moody algebras, BKM algebras, or Borcherds algebras. The best known example is the monster Lie algebra.

== Motivation ==
Finite-dimensional semisimple Lie algebras have the following properties:

- They have a nondegenerate symmetric invariant bilinear form (,).
- They have a grading such that the degree zero piece (the Cartan subalgebra) is abelian.
- They have a (Cartan) involution w.
- (a, w(a)) is positive if a is nonzero.

For example, for the algebras of n by n matrices of trace zero, the bilinear form is (a, b) = Trace(ab), the Cartan involution is given by minus the transpose, and the grading can be given by "distance from the diagonal" so that the Cartan subalgebra is the diagonal elements.

Conversely one can try to find all Lie algebras with these properties (and satisfying a few other technical conditions). The answer is that one gets sums of finite-dimensional and affine Lie algebras.

The monster Lie algebra satisfies a slightly weaker version of the conditions above: (a, w(a)) is positive if a is nonzero and has nonzero degree, but may be negative when a has degree zero. The Lie algebras satisfying these weaker conditions are more or less generalized Kac–Moody algebras. They are essentially the same as algebras given by certain generators and relations (described below).

Informally, generalized Kac–Moody algebras are the Lie algebras that behave like finite-dimensional semisimple Lie algebras. In particular they have a Weyl group, Weyl character formula, Cartan subalgebra, roots, weights, and so on.

== Definition ==
A symmetrized Cartan matrix is a (possibly infinite) square matrix with entries $c_{ij}$ such that

- $c_{ij}=c_{ji}\$
- $c_{ij}\le 0\$ if $i\ne j\$
- $2c_{ij}/c_{ii}\$ is an integer if $c_{ii}>0.\$

The universal generalized Kac–Moody algebra with given symmetrized Cartan matrix is defined by generators $e_i$ and $f_i$ and $h_i$ and relations

- $[e_i,f_j] = h_i\$ if $i =j$, 0 otherwise
- $[h_i,e_j]= c_{ij}e_j\$, $[h_i,f_j]=-c_{ij}f_j\$
- $[e_i,[e_i,\ldots,[e_i,e_j]]]= [f_i,[f_i,\ldots,[f_i,f_j]]] = 0\$ for $1-2c_{ij}/c_{ii}\$ applications of $e_i\$ or $f_i\$ if $c_{ii}>0\$
- $[e_i,e_j] = [f_i,f_j] = 0 \$ if $c_{ij} = 0.\$

These differ from the relations of a (symmetrizable) Kac–Moody algebra mainly by allowing the diagonal entries of the Cartan matrix to be non-positive. In other words, we allow simple roots to be imaginary, whereas in a Kac–Moody algebra simple roots are always real.

A generalized Kac–Moody algebra is obtained from a universal one by changing the Cartan matrix, by the operations of killing something in the center, or taking a central extension, or adding outer derivations.

Some authors give a more general definition by removing the condition that the Cartan matrix should be symmetric. Not much is known about these non-symmetrizable generalized Kac–Moody algebras, and there seem to be no interesting examples.

It is also possible to extend the definition to superalgebras.

== Structure ==
A generalized Kac–Moody algebra can be graded by giving e_{i} degree 1, f_{i} degree −1, and h_{i} degree 0.

The degree zero piece is an abelian subalgebra spanned by the elements h_{i} and is called the Cartan subalgebra.

== Properties ==
Most properties of generalized Kac–Moody algebras are straightforward extensions of the usual properties of (symmetrizable) Kac–Moody algebras.

- A generalized Kac–Moody algebra has an invariant symmetric bilinear form such that $(e_i,f_i)=1$.
- There is a character formula for highest weight modules, similar to the Weyl–Kac character formula for Kac–Moody algebras except that it has correction terms for the imaginary simple roots.

== Examples ==
Most generalized Kac–Moody algebras are thought not to have distinguishing features. The interesting ones are of three types:

- Finite-dimensional semisimple Lie algebras.
- Affine Kac–Moody algebras
- Algebras with Lorentzian Cartan subalgebra whose denominator function is an automorphic form of singular weight.

There appear to be only a finite number of examples of the third type. Two examples are the monster Lie algebra, acted on by the monster group and used in the monstrous moonshine conjectures, and the fake monster Lie algebra. There are similar examples associated to some of the other sporadic simple groups.

It is possible to find many examples of generalized Kac–Moody algebras using the following principle: anything that looks like a generalized Kac–Moody algebra is a generalized Kac–Moody algebra. More precisely, if a Lie algebra is graded by a Lorentzian lattice and has an invariant bilinear form and satisfies a few other easily checked technical conditions, then it is a generalized Kac–Moody algebra. In particular one can use vertex algebras to construct a Lie algebra from any even lattice. If the lattice is positive definite it gives a finite-dimensional semisimple Lie algebra, if it is positive semidefinite it gives an affine Lie algebra, and if it is Lorentzian it gives an algebra satisfying the conditions above that is therefore a generalized Kac–Moody algebra. When the lattice is the even 26 dimensional unimodular Lorentzian lattice the construction gives the fake monster Lie algebra; all other Lorentzian lattices seem to give uninteresting algebras.
