= Cartan matrix =

Matrices named after Élie Cartan

In mathematics, the term Cartan matrix has three meanings. All of these are named after the French mathematician Élie Cartan. Amusingly, the Cartan matrices in the context of Lie algebras were first investigated by Wilhelm Killing, whereas the Killing form is due to Cartan.

== Lie algebras ==
A (symmetrizable) generalized Cartan matrix is a square matrix $A = (a_{ij})$ with integer entries such that

1. For diagonal entries, $a_{ii} = 2$.
2. For non-diagonal entries, $a_{ij} \leq 0$.
3. $a_{ij} = 0$ if and only if $a_{ji} = 0$
4. $A$ can be written as $DS$, where $D$ is a diagonal matrix, and $S$ is a symmetric matrix.

For example, the Cartan matrix for G_{2} can be decomposed as such:

$$\begin{bmatrix}
2 & -3 \\
-1 &  2
\end{bmatrix} =
\begin{bmatrix}
3&0\\
0&1
\end{bmatrix}\begin{bmatrix}
\frac{2}{3} & -1 \\
-1           &  2
\end{bmatrix}.$$

The third condition is not independent but is really a consequence of the first and fourth conditions.

We can always choose a D with positive diagonal entries. In that case, if S in the above decomposition is positive definite, then A is said to be a Cartan matrix.

The Cartan matrix of a simple Lie algebra is the matrix whose elements are the scalar products

$a_{ji}=2 {(r_i,r_j)\over (r_j,r_j)}$

(sometimes called the Cartan integers) where r_{i} are the simple roots of the algebra. The entries are integral from one of the properties of roots. The first condition follows from the definition, the second from the fact that for $i\neq j, r_j-{2(r_i,r_j)\over (r_i,r_i)}r_i$ is a root which is a linear combination of the simple roots r_{i} and r_{j} with a positive coefficient for r_{j} and so, the coefficient for r_{i} has to be nonnegative. The third is true because orthogonality is a symmetric relation. And lastly, let $D_{ij}={\delta_{ij}\over (r_i,r_i)}$ and $S_{ij}=2(r_i,r_j)$. Because the simple roots span a Euclidean space, S is positive definite.

Conversely, given a generalized Cartan matrix, one can recover its corresponding Lie algebra. (See Kac–Moody algebra for more details).

=== Classification ===
An $n \times n$ matrix A is decomposable if there exists a nonempty proper subset $I \subset \{1,\dots,n\}$ such that $a_{ij} = 0$ whenever $i \in I$ and $j \notin I$. A is indecomposable if it is not decomposable.

Let A be an indecomposable generalized Cartan matrix. We say that A is of finite type if all of its principal minors are positive, that A is of affine type if its proper principal minors are positive and A has determinant 0, and that A is of indefinite type otherwise.

Finite type indecomposable matrices classify the finite dimensional simple Lie algebras (of types $A_n, B_n, C_n, D_n, E_6, E_7, E_8, F_4, G_2$), while affine type indecomposable matrices classify the affine Lie algebras (say over some algebraically closed field of characteristic 0).

==== Determinants of the Cartan matrices of the simple Lie algebras ====
The determinants of the Cartan matrices of the simple Lie algebras are given in the following table (along with A_{1}=B_{1}=C_{1}, B_{2}=C_{2}, D_{3}=A_{3}, D_{2}=A_{1}A_{1}, E_{5}=D_{5}, E_{4}=A_{4}, and E_{3}=A_{2}A_{1}).

| A_{n} | B_{n} | C_{n} | D_{n} n ≥ 3 | E_{n} 3 ≤ n ≤ 8 | F_{4} | G_{2} |
|---|---|---|---|---|---|---|
| n + 1 | 2 | 2 | 4 | 9 − n | 1 | 1 |

Another property of this determinant is that it is equal to the index of the associated root system, i.e. it is equal to $|P/Q|$ where P, Q denote the weight lattice and root lattice, respectively.

== Representations of finite-dimensional algebras ==
In modular representation theory, and more generally in the theory of representations of finite-dimensional associative algebras A that are not semisimple, a Cartan matrix is defined by considering a (finite) set of principal indecomposable modules and writing composition series for them in terms of irreducible modules, yielding a matrix of integers counting the number of occurrences of an irreducible module.

== Cartan matrices in M-theory ==
In M-theory, one may consider a geometry with two-cycles which intersects with each other at a finite number of points, in the limit where the area of the two-cycles goes to zero. At this limit, there appears a local symmetry group. The matrix of intersection numbers of a basis of the two-cycles is conjectured to be the Cartan matrix of the Lie algebra of this local symmetry group.

This can be explained as follows. In M-theory one has solitons which are two-dimensional surfaces called membranes or 2-branes. A 2-brane has a tension and thus tends to shrink, but it may wrap around a two-cycles which prevents it from shrinking to zero.

One may compactify one dimension which is shared by all two-cycles and their intersecting points, and then take the limit where this dimension shrinks to zero, thus getting a dimensional reduction over this dimension. Then one gets type IIA string theory as a limit of M-theory, with 2-branes wrapping a two-cycles now described by an open string stretched between D-branes. There is a U(1) local symmetry group for each D-brane, resembling the degree of freedom of moving it without changing its orientation. The limit where the two-cycles have zero area is the limit where these D-branes are on top of each other, so that one gets an enhanced local symmetry group.

Now, an open string stretched between two D-branes represents a Lie algebra generator, and the commutator of two such generator is a third one, represented by an open string which one gets by gluing together the edges of two open strings. The latter relation between different open strings is dependent on the way 2-branes may intersect in the original M-theory, i.e. in the intersection numbers of two-cycles. Thus the Lie algebra depends entirely on these intersection numbers. The precise relation to the Cartan matrix is because the latter describes the commutators of the simple roots, which are related to the two-cycles in the basis that is chosen.

Generators in the Cartan subalgebra are represented by open strings which are stretched between a D-brane and itself.

== See also ==
- Dynkin diagram
- Exceptional Jordan algebra
- Fundamental representation
- Killing form
- Simple Lie group
