= James Lepowsky =

American mathematician (born 1944)

- Born: July 5, 1944 (age 82); New York City
- Education: Massachusetts Institute of Technology
- Scientific career
- Thesis: Representations of semisimple Lie groups and an enveloping algebra decomposition (1970)
- Doctoral advisors: Bertram Kostant; Sigurdur Helgason
- Doctoral students: Katrina Barron

James Lepowsky (born July 5, 1944) is a professor of mathematics at Rutgers University, New Jersey. Previously he taught at Yale University. He received his Ph.D. from Massachusetts Institute of Technology in 1970 where his advisors were Bertram Kostant and Sigurdur Helgason. Lepowsky graduated from Stuyvesant High School in 1961, 16 years after Kostant. His current research is in the areas of infinite-dimensional Lie algebras and vertex algebras. He has written several books on vertex algebras and related topics. In 1988, in a joint work with Igor Frenkel and Arne Meurman, he constructed the monster vertex algebra (also known as the Moonshine module). His PhD students include Stefano Capparelli, Yi-Zhi Huang, Haisheng Li, Arne Meurman, and Antun Milas.

In 2012, he became a fellow of the American Mathematical Society.
