= Arne Meurman =

Swedish mathematician (born 1956)

Arne Meurman (born 6 April 1956) is a Swedish mathematician working on finite groups and vertex operator algebras. He is a professor emeritus at Lund University.

He is best known for constructing the monster vertex algebra together with Igor Frenkel and James Lepowsky.

In his free time Meurman plays chess, and he has competed in the finals of the top division in the regional Allskånskan competition with Lunds ASK.

== Publications ==
- Igor Frenkel, James Lepowsky, Arne Meurman, "Vertex operator algebras and the Monster". Pure and Applied Mathematics, 134. Academic Press, Inc., Boston, MA, 1988. liv+508 pp. ISBN 0-12-267065-5
- Arne Meurman, Mirko Primc, "Annihilating fields of standard modules of sl (2,C) and combinatorial identities", Memoirs AMS 1999
