= Reflection map =

Reflection map may refer to:

- Reflection mapping in computer graphics
- A reflection (mathematics), specifically
  - an element of a reflection group
  - an element of a Weyl group
- Reflection map (logic optimization), a conventional Gray code Karnaugh map in logic optimization
