= Parabolic subgroup of a reflection group =

Mathematical group

In the mathematical theory of reflection groups, the parabolic subgroups are a special kind of subgroup. In the symmetric group of permutations of the set $\{1, 2, \ldots, n\}$, which is generated by the set $S = \{(1\ 2), (2\ 3), \ldots, (n - 1\ n)\}$ of adjacent transpositions, a subgroup is a standard parabolic subgroup if it is generated by a subset of S; equivalently, they are the groups of permutations that come from partitioning the set $\{1, 2, \ldots, n\}$ into parts $\{1, 2, \ldots, a_1\}$, $\{a_1 + 1, a_1 + 2, \ldots, a_1 + a_2\}$, etc., each consisting of a subset of one or more consecutive values, and permuting the entries of each set among itself. (Note: In the case of the symmetric group, these are also known as Young subgroups.) The parabolic subgroups of the symmetric group include the standard parabolic subgroups as well as all of their conjugates. (Note: That is, a subgroup G of the symmetric group is parabolic if there is a standard parabolic subgroup P and a permutation g such that $G = \{ g w g^{-1} : w \in P\}$.)

The symmetric group belongs to a larger family of reflection groups called Coxeter groups, each of which comes with a special generating set S (generalizing the adjacent transpositions). In this larger family, a subgroup is a standard parabolic subgroup if it is generated by a subset of the special generating set S. Separately, the symmetric group belongs to a larger family of reflection groups called complex reflection groups, which are defined in terms of their action on certain geometric spaces (finite dimensional complex vector spaces). In this family, a subgroup is parabolic if it consists of all elements of the group that fix a given subset of the space pointwise. In the case of groups that are both Coxeter groups and complex reflection groups, the parabolic subgroups (in the second sense) consist of the standard parabolic subgroups (in the first sense) and all of their conjugates.

In all cases, the collection of parabolic subgroups exhibits important good behaviors. For example, the parabolic subgroups of a reflection group have a natural indexing set and form a lattice when ordered by inclusion.

In addition to their role in geometry (where they arise as symmetry groups of regular polyhedra), reflection groups arise in the theory of algebraic groups, through their connection with Weyl groups. The parabolic subgroups are so-named because they correspond to parabolic subgroups of algebraic groups in this setting.

== Background: reflection groups ==
The dihedral group D_{2×4} of symmetries of a square is a reflection group, generated by two reflections s (across the line y = 0) and t (across the line x = y), subject to the relation that (st)^{4} is the identity.

In a Euclidean space (such as the Euclidean plane, ordinary three-dimensional space, or their higher-dimensional analogues), a reflection is a symmetry of the space across a mirror (technically, across a subspace whose dimension is one less than the dimension of the whole space) that fixes the vectors that lie on the mirror and sends the vectors orthogonal to the mirror to their negatives. A finite real reflection group W is a finite group generated by reflections (that is, every linear transformation in W is a composition of some of the reflections in W). For example, the symmetries of a regular polygon in the plane form a reflection group (called the dihedral group), because each rotation symmetry of the polygon is a composition of two reflections. Finite real reflection groups can be generalized in various ways, and the definition of parabolic subgroup depends on the choice of generalization.

Each finite real reflection group W has the structure of a Coxeter group: this means that W contains a subset S of reflections (called simple reflections) such that S generates W, subject to relations of the form
$$W = \langle S \mid (s s')^{m_{s, s'}} = 1 \rangle,$$
where 1 denotes the identity in W and the $m_{s, s'}$ are numbers that satisfy $m_{s, s} = 1$ for $s \in S$ and $m_{s, s'} \in \{2, 3, \ldots\}$ for $s \neq s' \in S$. (Note: In general Coxeter groups, the possibility $m_{s, s'} = \infty$ is also allowed, meaning that no relation holds between s and s'—but this situation cannot occur in a finite group.) Thus, the Coxeter groups form one generalization of finite real reflection groups.

A separate generalization is to consider the geometric action on vector spaces whose underlying field is not the real numbers. Especially, if one replaces the real numbers with the complex numbers, with a corresponding generalization of the notion of a reflection, one arrives at the definition of a complex reflection group. (Note: Such groups are also known as unitary reflection groups or complex pseudo-reflection groups in some sources. Similarly, sometimes complex reflections (linear transformations that fix a hyperplane pointwise) are called pseudo-reflections.) Every real reflection group can be complexified to give a complex reflection group, so the complex reflection groups form another generalization of finite real reflection groups.

== Definitions ==
=== In Coxeter groups ===
The lattice of standard parabolic subgroups of the symmetric group S_{4}, generated as a Coxeter group by the simple reflections s_{1} = (1 2), s_{2} = (2 3), and s_{3} = (3 4) (the adjacent transpositions), with identity element ι

Suppose that W is a Coxeter group with a finite set S of simple reflections. For each subset I of S, let $W_I$ denote the subgroup of W generated by I. Such subgroups are called standard parabolic subgroups of the Coxeter system $(W, S)$. In the extreme cases, $W_\varnothing$ is the trivial subgroup (containing just the identity element of W) and $W_S = W$.

The pair $(W_I, I)$ is again a Coxeter system. Moreover, the Coxeter group structure on $W_I$ is compatible with that on W, in the following sense: if $\ell_S$ denotes the length function on W with respect to S (so that $\ell_S(w) = k$ if the element w of W can be written as a product of k elements of S and not fewer), then for every element w of $W_I$, one has that $\ell_S(w) = \ell_I(w)$. That is, the length of w is the same whether it is viewed as an element of W or of $W_I$. The same is true of the Bruhat order (an important partial order on the elements of a Coxeter group): if u and w are elements of $W_I$, then $u \leq w$ in the Bruhat order on $W_I$ if and only if $u \leq w$ in the Bruhat order on W.

If I and J are two subsets of S, then $W_I = W_J$ if and only if $I = J$. Also, $W_I \cap W_J = W_{I\cap J}$, and the smallest group $\langle W_I, W_J \rangle$ that contains both $W_I$ and $W_J$ is $W_{I \cup J}$. Consequently, when the standard parabolic subgroups of W are ordered by inclusion, the resulting lattice is the same as the Boolean lattice of all subsets of S ordered by inclusion.

Given a standard parabolic subgroup $W_I$ of a Coxeter system $(W, S)$, the cosets of $W_I$ in W have a particularly nice system of representatives: let $W^I$ denote the set
$$W^I = \{ w \in W \colon \ell_S(ws) > \ell_S(w) \text{ for all } s \in I\}$$
of elements in W that do not have any element of I as a right descent. (Note: A right descent of an element w in a Coxeter group is a simple reflection s such that $\ell_S(ws) < \ell_S(w)$.) Then for each $w \in W$, there are unique elements $u \in W^I$ and $v \in W_I$ such that $w = uv$. Moreover, this is a length-additive product, that is, $\ell_S(w) = \ell_S(u) + \ell_S(v)$. Furthermore, u is the element of minimum length in the coset $w W_I$. An analogous construction is valid for right cosets. The collection of all left cosets of standard parabolic subgroups is one possible construction of the Coxeter complex.

Every Coxeter system may be encoded as a Coxeter–Dynkin diagram, a graph whose nodes correspond to the elements of S and whose edges encode the orders $m_{s, s'}$ of the relations between pairs of generators. The Coxeter–Dynkin diagram of a standard parabolic subgroup arises by taking a subset of the nodes of the diagram and the edges induced between those nodes, erasing all others. The only normal parabolic subgroups arise by taking a union of connected components of the diagram, and the whole group W is the direct product of the irreducible Coxeter groups that correspond to the components.

=== In complex reflection groups ===
The lattice of parabolic subgroups of the dihedral group D_{2×4}, represented as a real reflection group, consists of the trivial subgroup, the four two-element subgroups generated by a single reflection, and the entire group. Ordered by inclusion, they give the same lattice as the lattice of fixed spaces ordered by reverse-inclusion.

Suppose that W is a complex reflection group acting on a complex vector space V. For any subset $A \subseteq V$, let
$$W_A = \{ w \in W \colon w(a) = a \text{ for all } a \in A\}$$
be the subset of W consisting of those elements in W that fix each element of A. (Note: Sometimes such subgroups are called isotropy groups.) Such a subgroup is called a parabolic subgroup of W. In the extreme cases, $W_{\varnothing} = W_{\{0\}} = W$ and $W_V$ is the trivial subgroup of W that contains only the identity element.

It follows from a theorem of Steinberg (1964) that each parabolic subgroup $W_A$ of a complex reflection group W is a reflection group, generated by the reflections in W that fix every point in A. Since W acts linearly on V, $W_A = W_{\overline{A}}$ where $\overline{A}$ is the span of A (that is, the smallest linear subspace of V that contains A). In fact, there is a simple choice of subspaces A that index the parabolic subgroups: each reflection in W fixes a hyperplane (that is, a subspace of V whose dimension is 1 less than that of V) pointwise, and the collection of all these hyperplanes is the reflection arrangement of W. The collection of all possible intersections among the hyperplanes in the reflection arrangement, (Note: Including the entire space V, as the empty intersection.) partially ordered by inclusion, is a lattice $L_W$. The elements of the lattice are precisely the fixed spaces of the elements of W (that is, for each intersection I of reflecting hyperplanes, there is an element $w \in W$ such that $\{v \in V \colon w(v) = v\} = I$). The map that sends $I \mapsto W_I$ for $I \in L_W$ is an order-reversing bijection between subspaces in $L_W$ and parabolic subgroups of W.

=== Compatibility of the definitions in finite real reflection groups ===
Let W be a finite real reflection group; that is, W is a finite group of linear transformations on a finite-dimensional real Euclidean space that is generated by orthogonal reflections. As mentioned above (see § Background: reflection groups), W may be viewed as both a Coxeter group and as a complex reflection group in a natural way. For a real reflection group W, the parabolic subgroups of W (viewed as a complex reflection group) are not all standard parabolic subgroups of W (when viewed as a Coxeter group, after specifying a fixed Coxeter generating set S), as there are many more subspaces in the intersection lattice of its reflection arrangement than subsets of S. However, in a finite real reflection group W, every parabolic subgroup is conjugate to a standard parabolic subgroup with respect to S.

== Examples ==
The lattice of parabolic subgroups of the group S^{B}_{2}, represented as signed permutations of {−2, −1, 1, 2}, with identity ι

The symmetric group $S_n$, which consists of all permutations of $\{1, \ldots, n\}$, is a Coxeter group with respect to the set of adjacent transpositions $(1\ 2)$, $(2\ 3)$, ..., $(n - 1\ n)$. The standard parabolic subgroups of $S_n$ (which are also known as Young subgroups) are the subgroups of the form $S_{a_1} \times \cdots \times S_{a_k}$, where $a_1, \ldots, a_k$ are positive integers with sum n, in which the first factor in the direct product permutes the elements $\{1, \ldots, a_1\}$ among themselves, the second factor permutes the elements $\{a_1 + 1, \ldots, a_1 + a_2\}$ among themselves, and so on.

The hyperoctahedral group $S^B_n$, which consists of all signed permutations of $\{\pm 1, \ldots, \pm n\}$ (that is, the bijections w on that set such that $w(-i) = - w(i)$ for all i), is a Coxeter group with respect to the generating set $\{(1\ {-1}), (1\ 2) (-1\ {-2}), \ldots, (n - 1\ n) (-n+1\ {-n})\}$. Its maximal standard parabolic subgroups are the setwise stabilizers of $\{i, \ldots, n\}$ for $i \in \{1, \ldots, n\}$.

In $S^B_2$, the maximal standard parabolic subgroups are $\{\iota, (1\ {-1})\}$ (stabilizing the set $\{2\}$) and $\{\iota, (1\ 2)(-1\ {-2})\}$ (stabilizing the set $\{1, 2\}$). Under conjugation, these yield the additional parabolic subgroups $\{\iota, (2\ {-2})\}$ and $\{\iota, (1\ {-2})(-1\ 2)\}$. The only other parabolic subgroups are the whole group and the trivial subgroup; when ordered by containment, these form a non-Boolean lattice, as depicted in the figure at right. (The hyperoctahedral group $S^B_2$ is isomorphic to the dihedral group $D_{2 \times 4}$ as Coxeter systems, which is why we get the same lattice of parabolic subgroups of the dihedral group $D_{2 \times 4}$ in the previous figure.)

== More general definitions in Coxeter theory ==
In a Coxeter system with a finite generating set S of simple reflections, one may define a parabolic subgroup to be any conjugate of a standard parabolic subgroup. Under this definition, it is still true that the intersection of any two parabolic subgroups is a parabolic subgroup. The same does not hold in general for Coxeter groups of infinite rank.

If W is a group and T is a subset of W, the pair $(W, T)$ is called a dual Coxeter system if there exists a subset S of T such that $(W, S)$ is a Coxeter system and
$$T = \{ w s w^{-1} \colon w \in W, s \in S \},$$
so that T is the set of all reflections (conjugates of the simple reflections) in W. For a dual Coxeter system $(W, T)$, a subgroup of W is said to be a parabolic subgroup if it is a standard parabolic subgroup (as in § In Coxeter groups) of $(W, S)$ for some choice of simple reflections S for $(W, T)$.

The reflection arrangement of the dihedral group D_{2×5}. One chamber is shaded gray. Any two reflections form a Coxeter generating set, but the pair {s, t} is not conjugate to the pair {r, t} .

In some dual Coxeter systems, all sets of simple reflections are conjugate to each other; in this case, the parabolic subgroups with respect to one simple system (that is, the conjugates of the standard parabolic subgroups) coincide with the parabolic subgroups with respect to any other simple system. However, even in finite examples, it may not be the case that all sets of simple reflections are conjugate: for example, if W is the dihedral group with 10 elements, viewed as symmetries of a regular pentagon, and T is the set of reflection symmetries of the polygon, then any pair of reflections in T forms a simple system for $(W, T)$, but not all pairs of reflections are conjugate to each other. (Note: In particular, in the classical construction of a Coxeter system, one would choose as S a set of reflections whose reflecting hyperplanes bound a chamber—a connected component in the complement of the hyperplanes. In the case of D_{2×5}, this would mean a pair of reflections whose reflecting lines make an angle of π/5 and bound one of the ten slices into which the reflection arrangement divides the plane; but one could instead choose as S one of the other pairs of reflections (whose reflecting lines make an angle of 2π/5), which is not conjugate to the pairs coming from a chamber.) Nevertheless, if W is finite, then the parabolic subgroups (in the sense above) coincide with the parabolic subgroups in the classical sense (that is, the conjugates of the standard parabolic subgroups with respect to a single, fixed, choice of simple reflections S). The same result does not hold in general for infinite Coxeter groups.

== Affine and crystallographic Coxeter groups ==
Among the finite real reflection groups, some (called Weyl groups) have the property that there is a periodic arrangement of points in space (a lattice) that is preserved by the action of the group. (For example, the usual square lattice in the plane is preserved by the action of the dihedral group $D_{2 \times 4}$, so it is a Weyl group; but no lattice in the plane is preserved by the group of symmetries of a regular pentagon.) Each Weyl group has an associated affine Coxeter group, an infinite Coxeter group generated by the reflections in the finite group together with a single reflection across a translated copy of one of the original reflecting hyperplanes. When W is an affine Coxeter group, the associated finite Weyl group is always a maximal parabolic subgroup, whose Coxeter–Dynkin diagram is the result of removing one node from the diagram of W. In particular, the length functions on the finite and affine groups coincide. In fact, every standard parabolic subgroup of an affine Coxeter group is finite. As in the case of finite real reflection groups, when we consider the action of an affine Coxeter group W on a Euclidean space V, the conjugates of the standard parabolic subgroups of W are precisely the subgroups of the form
$$\{w \in W \colon w(a) = a \text{ for all } a \in A\}$$
for some subset A of V.

Every (possibly infinite) Coxeter group has a special representation called its geometric representation. Generalizing the definition of Weyl group, we say that a (possibly infinite) Coxeter group is crystallographic if it stabilizes a lattice in its geometric representation. Then every parabolic subgroup of a crystallographic Coxeter group is also crystallographic.

== Connection with the theory of algebraic and Lie groups ==
The terminology parabolic subgroup arises from a connection between reflection groups and algebraic groups, such as the general linear group of $n \times n$ invertible matrices over a field; in general, an algebraic variety on which there is a compatible group structure. Each algebraic group satisfying certain technical conditions (Note: That the underlying field is algebraically closed; that the variety is an affine variety, or equivalently that the group is a linear algebraic group; that the group is connected in the Zariski topology; and that it is reductive, meaning that its only closed connected normal unipotent subgroup is the trivial subgroup.) has a special class of subgroups called Borel subgroups; in the general linear group, one such subgroup is the subgroup of invertible lower-triangular matrices, while in general they are the Zariski closed and connected solvable algebraic subgroups. If G is an algebraic group and B is a Borel subgroup for G, then a standard parabolic subgroup of G relative to B is any subgroup that contains B, and a parabolic subgroup is any subgroup that is a standard parabolic relative to some Borel subgroup, or equivalently (since all Borel subgroups are conjugate) any subgroup conjugate to a standard parabolic relative to B. (This use of the phrase "parabolic subgroup" was introduced by Roger Godement in his paper Godement (1961).) These are connected to parabolic subgroups of reflection groups, as follows.

Inside B, let T be a maximal torus, that is, a maximal subgroup isomorphic to $k^n$, where k is the underlying field. For example, in the case of the general linear group with B the lower-triangular matrices, one can take T to be the subgroup of invertible diagonal matrices. Let N be the normalizer of T in G; in the case of the general linear group, this is the subgroup of monomial matrices (matrices with exactly one nonzero entry in every row and column). Then $(B, N)$ is a (B, N) pair for G, and the associated quotient group $W = N / T$ is a Coxeter group, called the Weyl group of G. In the case of the general linear group, W is the symmetric group $S_n$. The group G has a Bruhat decomposition $G = \bigsqcup_{w \in W} BwB$, where $\sqcup$ is the disjoint union and $BwB = \{ b_1 w b_2 \mid b_1, b_2 \in B\}$ is a double coset of B, and the standard parabolic subgroups of G with respect to B are precisely the subgroups of the form
$$P_J = BW_JB = \bigsqcup_{w \in W_J} BwB,$$
where $W_J$ is a standard parabolic subgroup of W.

For example, when $G = \mathrm{GL}_4(k)$ is the general linear group of 4 × 4 invertible matrices over the field k, the associated Weyl group is the symmetric group $W = S_4$ of 4 × 4 permutation matrices. Taking the Borel subgroup B of lower-triangular invertible matrices, the corresponding Coxeter generating set consists of
$$s_1 = \begin{bmatrix}0 & 1 & 0 & 0 \\ 1 & 0 & 0 & 0 \\ 0 & 0 & 1 & 0\\ 0 & 0 & 0 & 1\end{bmatrix}, s_2 = \begin{bmatrix}1 & 0 & 0 & 0 \\ 0 & 0 & 1 & 0\\0 & 1 & 0 & 0 \\ 0 & 0 & 0 & 1\end{bmatrix}, \text{ and } s_3 = \begin{bmatrix}1 & 0 & 0 & 0 \\0 & 1 & 0 & 0 \\ 0 & 0 & 0 & 1\\ 0 & 0 & 1 & 0\end{bmatrix}.$$
Then for each subset J of $S = \{s_1, s_2, s_3\}$, the corresponding parabolic subgroups of G are
$$B = BW_{\varnothing}B = \left\{\begin{bmatrix}* & 0 & 0 & 0 \\ * & * & 0 & 0 \\ * & * & * & 0\\ * & * & * & *\end{bmatrix}\right\},
BW_{\{s_1\}}B = \left\{\begin{bmatrix}* & * & 0 & 0 \\ * & * & 0 & 0 \\ * & * & * & 0\\ * & * & * & *\end{bmatrix}\right\},$$
$$BW_{\{s_2\}}B = \left\{\begin{bmatrix}* & 0 & 0 & 0 \\ * & * & * & 0 \\ * & * & * & 0\\ * & * & * & *\end{bmatrix}\right\},
BW_{\{s_3\}}B = \left\{\begin{bmatrix}* & 0 & 0 & 0 \\ * & * & 0 & 0 \\ * & * & * & *\\ * & * & * & *\end{bmatrix}\right\},$$
$$BW_{\{s_1, s_2\}}B = \left\{\begin{bmatrix}* & * & * & 0 \\ * & * & * & 0 \\ * & * & * & 0\\ * & * & * & *\end{bmatrix}\right\},
BW_{\{s_1, s_3\}}B = \left\{\begin{bmatrix}* & * & 0 & 0 \\ * & * & 0 & 0 \\ * & * & * & *\\ * & * & * & *\end{bmatrix}\right\},$$
$$BW_{\{s_2,s_3\}}B = \left\{\begin{bmatrix}* & 0 & 0 & 0 \\ * & * & * & * \\ * & * & * & *\\ * & * & * & *\end{bmatrix}\right\},
\text{ and } BWB = G,$$
where the starred entries can take any values in k (provided the resulting matrix is invertible).

A similar account could be given in terms of Lie groups (groups with a natural structure as differentiable manifolds rather than as algebraic varieties). In this context the Borel subgroups are also defined to be the maximal closed and connected solvable subgroups, and the parabolic subgroups are the subgroups that contain a Borel subgroup. In the case the general linear group over the real or complex numbers viewed as a Lie group, the standard parabolic subgroups are the same subgroups as when it is viewed as an algebraic group, namely, they are the subgroups of block triangular matrices.

== Parabolic closures ==
Suppose W is a Coxeter group of finite rank (that is, the set S of simple generators is finite). Given any subset X of W, one may define the parabolic closure of X to be the intersection of all parabolic subgroups containing X. As mentioned above, in this case the intersection of any two parabolic subgroups of W is again a parabolic subgroup of W, and consequently the parabolic closure of X is a parabolic subgroup of W; in particular, it is the (unique) minimal parabolic subgroup of W containing X. The same analysis applies to complex reflection groups, where the parabolic closure of X is also the pointwise stabiliser of the space of fixed points of X. The same does not hold for Coxeter groups of infinite rank.

== Braid groups ==
s_{1}s_{3} = s_{3}s_{1}

(s_{1})^{2}

In the generalized braid group of the symmetric group S_{4}, the relations involving more than one generator still hold, but the square of each generator is no longer the identity.

Each Coxeter group is associated to another group called its Artin–Tits group or generalized braid group, which is defined by omitting the relations $s^2 = 1$ for each generator $s \in S$ from its Coxeter presentation. (The name "generalized braid group" arises from the fact that, in the special case $W = S_n$ is the symmetric group, the associated Artin–Tits group is the braid group on n strands.) Although generalized braid groups are not reflection groups, they inherit a notion of parabolic subgroups: a standard parabolic subgroup of a generalized braid group is a subgroup generated by a subset of the standard generating set S, and a parabolic subgroup is any subgroup conjugate to a standard parabolic.

A generalized braid group is said to be of spherical type if the associated Coxeter group is finite. If B is a generalized braid group of spherical type, then the intersection of any two parabolic subgroups of B is also a parabolic subgroup. Consequently, the parabolic subgroups of B form a lattice under inclusion.

For a finite real reflection group W, the associated generalized braid group may be defined in purely topological language, without referring to a particular group presentation. (Note: In particular, the group W acts on the complement of the complexification of the arrangement of its reflecting hyperplanes; the generalized braid group of W is the fundamental group of the quotient of this space under the action of W.) This definition naturally extends to finite complex reflection groups. Parabolic subgroups can also be defined in this setting.
