= Products in algebraic topology =

In algebraic topology, several types of products are defined on homological and cohomological theories.

== The cross product ==
$$H_p(X) \otimes H_q(Y) \to H_{p+q}(X\times Y)$$

When X and Y are CW complexes, then the product $X \times Y$ has a natural CW structure, and the cross product can be understood as induced by the chain map sending a p-cell $e_p$ in X and a q-cell $e_q$ in Y to the product cell $e_p \times e_q$ in $X \times Y$. An equivalent but slightly more complicated definition can be given for singular homology. The cross product is used to prove the Künneth theorem relating the homology of X and Y to the homology of $X \times Y$.

== The cap product ==
$$\frown\ : H_p(X;R)\times H^q(X;R) \rightarrow H_{p-q}(X;R)$$

== The slant product ==
$$/ : H_p(X;R)\times H^q(X\times Y;R) \rightarrow H^{q-p}(Y;R)$$

== The cup product ==
$$H^p(X) \otimes H^q(X) \to H^{p+q}(X)$$

This product can be understood as induced by the exterior product of differential forms in de Rham cohomology. It makes the singular cohomology of a connected manifold into a unitary supercommutative ring.

== See also ==
- Singular homology
- Differential graded algebra: the algebraic structure arising on the cochain level for the cup product
- Poincaré duality: swaps some of these
- Intersection theory: for a similar theory in algebraic geometry
