= Lie group decomposition =

In mathematics, Lie group decompositions are used to analyse the structure of Lie groups and associated objects, by showing how they are built up out of subgroups. They are essential technical tools in the representation theory of Lie groups and Lie algebras; they can also be used to study the algebraic topology of such groups and associated homogeneous spaces. Since the use of Lie group methods became one of the standard techniques in twentieth century mathematics, many phenomena can now be referred back to decompositions.

The same ideas are often applied to Lie groups, Lie algebras, algebraic groups and p-adic number analogues, making it harder to summarise the facts into a unified theory.

== List of decompositions ==
- The Jordan–Chevalley decomposition of an element in algebraic group as a product of semisimple and unipotent elements
- The Bruhat decomposition $G=BWB$ of a semisimple algebraic group into double cosets of a Borel subgroup can be regarded as a generalization of the principle of Gauss–Jordan elimination, which generically writes a matrix as the product of an upper triangular matrix with a lower triangular matrix—but with exceptional cases. It is related to the Schubert cell decomposition of Grassmannians: see Weyl group for more details.
- The Cartan decomposition writes a semisimple real Lie algebra as the sum of eigenspaces of a Cartan involution.
- The Iwasawa decomposition $G=KAN$ of a semisimple group $G$ as the product of compact, abelian, and nilpotent subgroups generalises the way a square real matrix can be written as a product of an orthogonal matrix and an upper triangular matrix (a consequence of Gram–Schmidt orthogonalization).
- The Langlands decomposition $P=MAN$ writes a parabolic subgroup $P$ of a Lie group as the product of semisimple, abelian, and nilpotent subgroups.
- The Levi decomposition writes a finite dimensional Lie algebra as a semidirect product of a solvable ideal and a semisimple subalgebra.
- The LU decomposition of a dense subset in the general linear group. It can be considered as a special case of the Bruhat decomposition.
- The Birkhoff decomposition, a special case of the Bruhat decomposition for affine groups.
