= Young subgroup =

In mathematics, the Young subgroups of the symmetric group $S_n$ are special subgroups that arise in combinatorics and representation theory. When $S_n$ is viewed as the group of permutations of the set $\{1, 2, \ldots, n\}$, and if $\lambda = (\lambda_1, \ldots, \lambda_\ell)$ is an integer partition of $n$, then the Young subgroup $S_\lambda$ indexed by $\lambda$ is defined by
$$S_\lambda = S_{\{1, 2, \ldots, \lambda_1\}} \times S_{\{\lambda_1 + 1, \lambda_1 + 2, \ldots, \lambda_1 + \lambda_2\}} \times \cdots \times S_{\{n - \lambda_\ell + 1, n - \lambda_\ell + 2, \ldots, n\}},$$
where $S_{\{a, b, \ldots\}}$ denotes the set of permutations of $\{a, b, \ldots\}$ and $\times$ denotes the direct product of groups. Abstractly, $S_\lambda$ is isomorphic to the product $S_{\lambda_1} \times S_{\lambda_2} \times \cdots \times S_{\lambda_\ell}$. Young subgroups are named for Alfred Young.

When $S_n$ is viewed as a reflection group, its Young subgroups are precisely its parabolic subgroups. They may equivalently be defined as the subgroups generated by a subset of the adjacent transpositions $(1 \ 2), (2 \ 3), \ldots, (n - 1 \ n)$.

In some cases, the name Young subgroup is used more generally for the product $S_{B_1} \times \cdots \times S_{B_\ell}$, where $\{B_1, \ldots, B_\ell\}$ is any set partition of $\{1, \ldots, n\}$ (that is, a collection of disjoint, nonempty subsets whose union is $\{1, \ldots, n\}$). This more general family of subgroups consists of all the conjugates of those under the previous definition. These subgroups may also be characterized as the subgroups of $S_n$ that are generated by a set of transpositions.
