= Parabolic subgroup =

Parabolic subgroup may refer to:

- a parabolic subgroup of a reflection group
- a subgroup of an algebraic group that contains a Borel subgroup
