= Lefschetz duality =

Topological duality

In mathematics, Lefschetz duality is a version of Poincaré duality in geometric topology, applying to a manifold with boundary. Such a formulation was introduced by Solomon Lefschetz (1926), at the same time introducing relative homology, for application to the Lefschetz fixed-point theorem. There are now numerous formulations of Lefschetz duality or Poincaré–Lefschetz duality, or Alexander–Lefschetz duality.

== Formulations ==
Let M be an orientable compact manifold of dimension n, with boundary $\partial(M)$, and let $z\in H_n(M,\partial(M); \Z)$ be the fundamental class of the manifold M. Then cap product with z (or its dual class in cohomology) induces a pairing of the (co)homology groups of M and the relative (co)homology of the pair $(M,\partial(M))$. Furthermore, this gives rise to isomorphisms of $H^k(M,\partial(M); \Z)$ with $H_{n-k}(M; \Z)$, and of $H_k(M,\partial(M); \Z)$ with $H^{n-k}(M; \Z)$ for all $k$.

Here $\partial(M)$ can in fact be empty, so Poincaré duality appears as a special case of Lefschetz duality.

There is a version for triples. Let $\partial(M)$ decompose into subspaces A and B, themselves compact orientable manifolds with common boundary Z, which is the intersection of A and B. Then, for each $k$, there is an isomorphism

$$D_M\colon H^k(M,A; \Z)\to H_{n-k}(M,B; \Z).$$
