= Poincaré duality =

Connects homology and cohomology groups for oriented closed manifolds

In mathematics, the Poincaré duality theorem, named after Henri Poincaré, is a basic result on the structure of the homology and cohomology groups of manifolds. It states that if M is an n-dimensional oriented closed manifold (compact and without boundary), then the kth cohomology group of M is isomorphic to the (n − k)th homology group of M, for all integers k

$$H^k(M) \cong H_{n-k}(M).$$

Poincaré duality holds for any coefficient ring, so long as one has taken an orientation with respect to that coefficient ring; in particular, since every manifold has a unique orientation mod 2, Poincaré duality holds mod 2 without any assumption of orientation.

== History ==
A form of Poincaré duality was first stated, without proof, by Henri Poincaré in 1893. It was stated in terms of Betti numbers: The kth and (n − k)th Betti numbers of a closed (i.e., compact and without boundary) orientable n-manifold are equal. The cohomology concept was at that time about 40 years from being clarified. In his 1895 paper Analysis Situs, Poincaré tried to prove the theorem using topological intersection theory, which he had invented. Criticism of his work by Poul Heegaard led him to realize that his proof was seriously flawed. In the first two complements to Analysis Situs, Poincaré gave a new proof in terms of dual triangulations.

Poincaré duality did not take on its modern form until the advent of cohomology in the 1930s, when Eduard Čech and Hassler Whitney invented the cup and cap products and formulated Poincaré duality in these new terms.

== Modern formulation ==
The modern statement of the Poincaré duality theorem is in terms of homology and cohomology: if M is a closed oriented n-manifold, then there is a canonically defined isomorphism $H^k(M, \Z) \to H_{n-k}(M, \Z)$ for any integer k. To define such an isomorphism, one chooses a fixed fundamental class [M] of M, which will exist if $M$ is oriented. Then the isomorphism is defined by mapping an element $\alpha \in H^k(M)$ to the cap product $[M]\frown \alpha$.

Homology and cohomology groups are defined to be zero for negative degrees, so Poincaré duality in particular implies that the homology and cohomology groups of orientable closed n-manifolds are zero for degrees bigger than n.

Here, homology and cohomology are integral, but the isomorphism remains valid over any coefficient ring. In the case where an oriented manifold is not compact, one has to replace homology by Borel–Moore homology

$$H^i(X) \stackrel{\cong}{\to} H_{n-i}^{BM}(X),$$

or replace cohomology by cohomology with compact support

$$H^i_c(X) \stackrel{\cong}{\to} H_{n-i}(X).$$

== Dual cell structures ==
Given a triangulated manifold, there is a corresponding dual polyhedral decomposition. The dual polyhedral decomposition is a cell decomposition of the manifold such that the k-cells of the dual polyhedral decomposition are in bijective correspondence with the ($n-k$)-cells of the triangulation, generalizing the notion of dual polyhedra.

$\cup_{S \in T} \Delta \cap DS$ – a picture of the parts of the dual-cells in a top-dimensional simplex.

Precisely, let $T$ be a triangulation of an $n$-manifold $M$. Let $S$ be a simplex of $T$. Let $\Delta$ be a top-dimensional simplex of $T$ containing $S$, so we can think of $S$ as a subset of the vertices of $\Delta$. Define the dual cell $DS$ corresponding to $S$ so that $\Delta \cap DS$ is the convex hull in $\Delta$ of the barycentres of all subsets of the vertices of $\Delta$ that contain $S$. One can check that if $S$ is $i$-dimensional, then $DS$ is an $(n-i)$-dimensional cell. Moreover, the dual cells to $T$ form a CW-decomposition of $M$, and the only ($n-i$)-dimensional dual cell that intersects an $i$-cell $S$ is $DS$. Thus the pairing $C_i M \otimes C_{n-i} M \to \Z$ given by taking intersections induces an isomorphism $C_i M \to C^{\, n-i} M$, where $C_i$ is the cellular homology of the triangulation $T$, and $C_{n-i} M$ and $C^{\, n-i} M$ are the cellular homologies and cohomologies of the dual polyhedral/CW decomposition the manifold respectively. The fact that this is an isomorphism of chain complexes is a proof of Poincaré duality. Roughly speaking, this amounts to the fact that the boundary relation for the triangulation $T$ is the incidence relation for the dual polyhedral decomposition under the correspondence $S \longmapsto DS$.

=== Naturality ===
Note that $H^k$ is a contravariant functor while $H_{n-k}$ is covariant. The family of isomorphisms

$$D_M\colon H^k(M) \to H_{n-k}(M)$$

is natural in the following sense: if

$$f\colon M\to N$$

is a continuous map between two oriented n-manifolds which is compatible with orientation, i.e. which maps the fundamental class of M to the fundamental class of N, then

$$D_N = f_{*} \circ D_M \circ f^{*} ,$$

where $f_{*}$ and $f^{*}$ are the maps induced by $f$ in homology and cohomology, respectively.

Note the very strong and crucial hypothesis that $f$ maps the fundamental class of M to the fundamental class of N. Naturality does not hold for an arbitrary continuous map $f$, since in general $f^{*}$ is not an injection on cohomology. For example, if $f$ is a covering map then it maps the fundamental class of M to a multiple of the fundamental class of N. This multiple is the degree of the map $f$.

== Bilinear pairings formulation ==
Assuming the manifold M is compact, boundaryless, and orientable, let

$$\tau H_i M$$

denote the torsion subgroup of $H_i M$ and let

$$fH_i M = H_i M / \tau H_i M$$

be the free part – all homology groups taken with integer coefficients in this section. Then there are bilinear maps which are duality pairings (explained below).

$$fH_i M \otimes fH_{n-i} M \to \Z$$

and

$$\tau H_i M \otimes \tau H_{n-i-1} M \to \Q/\Z$$.

Here $\Q/\Z$ is the quotient of the rationals by the integers, taken as an additive group. Notice that in the torsion linking form, there is a −1 in the dimension, so the paired dimensions add up to n − 1, rather than to n.

The first form is typically called the intersection product and the 2nd the torsion linking form. Assuming the manifold M is smooth, the intersection product is computed by perturbing the homology classes to be transverse and computing their oriented intersection number. For the torsion linking form, one computes the pairing of x and y by realizing nx as the boundary of some class z. The form then takes the value equal to the fraction whose numerator is the transverse intersection number of z with y, and whose denominator is n.

The statement that the pairings are duality pairings means that the adjoint maps

$$fH_i M \to \mathrm{Hom}_{\Z}(fH_{n-i} M,\Z)$$

and

$$\tau H_i M \to \mathrm{Hom}_{\Z}(\tau H_{n-i-1} M, \Q/\Z)$$

are isomorphisms of groups.

This result is an application of Poincaré duality

$$H_i M \simeq H^{n-i} M$$,

together with the universal coefficient theorem, which gives an identification

$$fH^{n-i} M \equiv \mathrm{Hom}(H_{n-i} M; \Z)$$

and

$$\tau H^{n-i} M \equiv \mathrm{Ext}(H_{n-i-1} M; \Z) \equiv \mathrm{Hom}(\tau H_{n-i-1} M; \Q/\Z)$$.

Thus, Poincaré duality says that $fH_i M$ and $fH_{n-i} M$ are isomorphic, although there is no natural map giving the isomorphism, and similarly $\tau H_i M$ and $\tau H_{n-i-1} M$ are also isomorphic, though not naturally.

Middle dimension

While for most dimensions, Poincaré duality induces a bilinear pairing between different homology groups, in the middle dimension it induces a bilinear form on a single homology group. The resulting intersection form is a very important topological invariant.

What is meant by "middle dimension" depends on parity. For even dimension n = 2k, which is more common, this is literally the middle dimension k, and there is a form on the free part of the middle homology:

$$fH_k M \otimes fH_k M \to \Z$$

By contrast, for odd dimension n = 2k + 1, which is less commonly discussed, it is most simply the lower middle dimension k, and there is a form on the torsion part of the homology in that dimension:

$$\tau H_k M \otimes \tau H_k M \to \Q/\Z.$$

However, there is also a pairing between the free part of the homology in the lower middle dimension k and in the upper middle dimension k + 1:

$$fH_k M \otimes fH_{k+1} M \to \Z.$$

The resulting groups, while not a single group with a bilinear form, are a simple chain complex and are studied in algebraic L-theory.

Applications

This approach to Poincaré duality was used by Józef Przytycki and Akira Yasuhara to give an elementary homotopy and diffeomorphism classification of 3-dimensional lens spaces.

== Application to Euler characteristics ==
An immediate result from Poincaré duality is that any closed odd-dimensional manifold M has Euler characteristic zero, which in turn gives that any manifold that bounds has even Euler characteristic.

== Thom isomorphism formulation ==
Poincaré duality is closely related to the Thom isomorphism theorem. Let $M$ be a compact, boundaryless oriented n-manifold, and M × M the product of M with itself. Let V be an open tubular neighbourhood of the diagonal in M × M. Consider the maps:

- $H_* M \otimes H_* M \to H_* (M \times M)$ the homology cross product
- $H_* (M \times M) \to H_* \left(M \times M, (M \times M) \setminus V\right)$ inclusion.
- $H_* \left(M \times M, (M \times M) \setminus V\right) \to H_* (\nu M, \partial \nu M)$ excision map where $\nu M$ is the normal disc bundle of the diagonal in $M \times M$.
- $H_* (\nu M, \partial \nu M) \to H_{*-n} M$ the Thom isomorphism. This map is well-defined as there is a standard identification $\nu M \equiv TM$ which is an oriented bundle, so the Thom isomorphism applies.

Combined, this gives a map $H_i M \otimes H_j M \to H_{i+j-n} M$, which is the intersection product, generalizing the intersection product discussed above. A similar argument with the Künneth theorem gives the torsion linking form.

This formulation of Poincaré duality has become popular as it defines Poincaré duality for any generalized homology theory, given a Künneth theorem and a Thom isomorphism for that homology theory. A Thom isomorphism theorem for a homology theory is now viewed as the generalized notion of orientability for that theory. For example, a spin^{C}-structure on a manifold is a precise analog of an orientation within complex topological k-theory.

== Generalizations and related results ==
The Poincaré–Lefschetz duality theorem is a generalisation for manifolds with boundary. In the non-orientable case, taking into account the sheaf of local orientations, one can give a statement that is independent of orientability: see twisted Poincaré duality.

Blanchfield duality is a version of Poincaré duality which provides an isomorphism between the homology of an abelian covering space of a manifold and the corresponding cohomology with compact supports. It is used to get basic structural results about the Alexander module and can be used to define the signatures of a knot.

With the development of homology theory to include K-theory and other extraordinary theories from about 1955, it was realised that the homology $H'_*$ could be replaced by other theories, once the products on manifolds were constructed; and there are now textbook treatments in generality. More specifically, there is a general Poincaré duality theorem for a generalized homology theory which requires a notion of orientation with respect to a homology theory, and is formulated in terms of a generalized Thom isomorphism theorem. The Thom isomorphism theorem in this regard can be considered as the germinal idea for Poincaré duality for generalized homology theories.

Verdier duality is the appropriate generalization to (possibly singular) geometric objects, such as analytic spaces or schemes, while intersection homology was developed by Robert MacPherson and Mark Goresky for stratified spaces, such as real or complex algebraic varieties, precisely so as to generalise Poincaré duality to such stratified spaces.

There are many other forms of geometric duality in algebraic topology, including Lefschetz duality, Alexander duality, Hodge duality, and S-duality.

More algebraically, one can abstract the notion of a Poincaré complex, which is an algebraic object that behaves like the singular chain complex of a manifold, notably satisfying Poincaré duality on its homology groups, with respect to a distinguished element (corresponding to the fundamental class). These are used in surgery theory to algebraicize questions about manifolds. A Poincaré space is one whose singular chain complex is a Poincaré complex. These are not all manifolds, but their failure to be manifolds can be measured by obstruction theory.

== See also ==
- Bruhat decomposition
- Fundamental class
- Weyl group
