= Longest element of a Coxeter group =

Unique element of maximal length in a finite Coxeter group

In mathematics, the longest element of a Coxeter group is the unique element of maximal length in a finite Coxeter group with respect to the chosen generating set consisting of simple reflections. It is often denoted by w_{0}.

== Properties ==
- A Coxeter group has a longest element if and only if it is finite; "only if" is because the size of the group is bounded by the number of words of length less than or equal to the maximum.
- The longest element of a Coxeter group is the unique maximal element with respect to the Bruhat order.
- The longest element is an involution (has order 2: $w_0^{-1} = w_0$), by uniqueness of maximal length (the inverse of an element has the same length as the element).
- For any $w \in W,$ the length satisfies $\ell(w_0w) = \ell(w_0) - \ell(w).$
- A reduced expression for the longest element is not in general unique.
- In a reduced expression for the longest element, every simple reflection must occur at least once.
- If the Coxeter group is finite then the length of w_{0} is the number of the positive roots.
- The open cell Bw_{0}B in the Bruhat decomposition of a semisimple algebraic group G is dense in Zariski topology; topologically, it is the top dimensional cell of the decomposition, and represents the fundamental class.
- The longest element is the central element −1 except for $A_n$ ($n \geq 2$), $D_n$ for n odd, $E_6,$ and $I_2(p)$ for p odd, when it is −1 multiplied by the order 2 automorphism of the Coxeter diagram.

== See also ==
- Coxeter element, a different distinguished element
- Coxeter number
- Length function
