= Coxeter group =

Group that admits a formal description in terms of reflections

In mathematics, a Coxeter group, named after H. S. M. Coxeter, is an abstract group that admits a formal description in terms of reflections (or kaleidoscopic mirrors). Indeed, the finite Coxeter groups are precisely the finite Euclidean reflection groups; for example, the symmetry group of each regular polyhedron is a finite Coxeter group. However, not all Coxeter groups are finite, and not all can be described in terms of symmetries and Euclidean reflections. Coxeter groups were introduced in 1934 as abstractions of reflection groups, and finite Coxeter groups were classified in 1935.

Coxeter groups find applications in many areas of mathematics. Examples of finite Coxeter groups include the symmetry groups of regular polytopes, and the Weyl groups of simple Lie algebras. Examples of infinite Coxeter groups include the triangle groups corresponding to regular tessellations of the Euclidean plane and the hyperbolic plane, and the Weyl groups of infinite-dimensional Kac–Moody algebras.

== Definition ==
Formally, a Coxeter group can be defined as a group with the presentation
$$\left\langle r_1,r_2,\ldots,r_n \mid (r_ir_j)^{m_{ij}}=1\right\rangle$$
where $m_{ii}=1$ and $m_{ij} = m_{ji} \ge 2$ is either an integer or $\infty$ for $i\neq j$. Here, the condition $m_{i j}=\infty$ means that no relation of the form $(r_ir_j)^m = 1$ for any integer $m \ge 2$ should be imposed.

The pair $(W,S)$ where $W$ is a Coxeter group with generators $S=\{r_1, \dots , r_n\}$ is called a Coxeter system. Note that in general $S$ is not uniquely determined by $W$. For example, the Coxeter groups of type $B_3$ and $A_1\times A_3$ are isomorphic but the Coxeter systems are not equivalent, since the former has 3 generators and the latter has 1 + 3 = 4 generators (see below for an explanation of this notation).

A number of conclusions can be drawn immediately from the above definition.

- The relation $m_{ii} = 1$ means that $(r_ir_i)^1 = (r_i)^2 = 1$ for all $i$ ; as such the generators are involutions.
- If $m_{ij} = 2$, then the generators $r_i$ and $r_j$ commute. This follows by observing that

$$xx = yy = 1$$,

together with

$$xyxy = 1$$

implies that

$$xy = x(xyxy)y = (xx)yx(yy) = yx$$.

Alternatively, since the generators are involutions, $r_i = r_i^{-1}$, so $1 =(r_ir_j)^2=r_ir_jr_ir_j=r_ir_jr_i^{-1}r_j^{-1}$. That is to say, the commutator of $r_i$ and $r_j$ is equal to 1, or equivalently that $r_i$ and $r_j$ commute.

The reason that $m_{ij} = m_{ji}$ for $i \neq j$ is stipulated in the definition is that

$$yy = 1$$,

together with

$$(xy)^m = 1$$

already implies that

$$(yx)^m = (yx)^myy = y(xy)^my = yy = 1$$.

An alternative proof of this implication is the observation that $(xy)^k$ and $(yx)^k$ are conjugates: indeed $y(xy)^k y^{-1} = (yx)^k yy^{-1}=(yx)^k$.

=== Coxeter matrix and Schläfli matrix ===
The Coxeter matrix is the $n\times n$ symmetric matrix with entries $m_{ij}$. Indeed, every symmetric matrix with diagonal entries exclusively 1 and nondiagonal entries in the set $\{2,3,\ldots\} \cup \{\infty\}$ is a Coxeter matrix.

The Coxeter matrix can be conveniently encoded by a Coxeter diagram, as per the following rules.

- The vertices of the graph are labelled by generator subscripts.
- Vertices $i$ and $j$ are adjacent if and only if $m_{ij}\geq 3$.
- An edge is labelled with the value of $m_{ij}$ whenever the value is $4$ or greater.

In particular, two generators commute if and only if they are not joined by an edge. Furthermore, if a Coxeter graph has two or more connected components, the associated group is the direct product of the groups associated to the individual components. Thus the disjoint union of Coxeter graphs yields a direct product of Coxeter groups.

The Coxeter matrix, $M_{ij}$, is related to the $n\times n$ Schläfli matrix $C$ with entries $C_{ij} = -2\cos(\pi/M_{ij})$, but the elements are modified, being proportional to the dot product of the pairwise generators. The Schläfli matrix is useful because its eigenvalues determine whether the Coxeter group is of finite type (all positive), affine type (all non-negative, at least one zero), or indefinite type (otherwise). The indefinite type is sometimes further subdivided, e.g. into hyperbolic and other Coxeter groups. However, there are multiple non-equivalent definitions for hyperbolic Coxeter groups.

Examples
Coxeter group	A_{1}×A_{1}	A_{2}	B_{2}	I_{2}(5)	G_{2}	${\tilde{A}}_1 = I_2(\infty)$	A_{3}	B_{3}	D_{4}	${\tilde{A}}_3$
Coxeter diagram										
Coxeter matrix	$\left [ \begin{smallmatrix} 1 & 2 \\ 2 & 1 \\ \end{smallmatrix}\right ]$	$\left [ \begin{smallmatrix} 1 & 3 \\ 3 & 1 \\ \end{smallmatrix}\right ]$	$\left [ \begin{smallmatrix} 1 & 4 \\ 4 & 1 \\ \end{smallmatrix}\right ]$	$\left [ \begin{smallmatrix} 1 & 5 \\ 5 & 1 \\ \end{smallmatrix}\right ]$	$\left [ \begin{smallmatrix} 1 & 6 \\ 6 & 1 \\ \end{smallmatrix}\right ]$	$\left [ \begin{smallmatrix} 1 & \infty \\ \infty & 1 \\ \end{smallmatrix}\right ]$	$\left [ \begin{smallmatrix} 1 & 3 & 2 \\ 3 & 1 & 3 \\ 2 & 3 & 1 \end{smallmatrix}\right ]$	$\left [ \begin{smallmatrix} 1 & 4 & 2 \\ 4 & 1 & 3 \\ 2 & 3 & 1 \end{smallmatrix}\right ]$	$\left [ \begin{smallmatrix} 1 & 3 & 2 & 2 \\ 3 & 1 & 3 & 3 \\ 2 & 3 & 1 & 2\\ 2 & 3 & 2 & 1 \end{smallmatrix}\right ]$	$\left [ \begin{smallmatrix} 1 & 3 & 2 & 3 \\ 3 & 1 & 3 & 2 \\ 2 & 3 & 1 & 3\\ 3 & 2 & 3 & 1 \end{smallmatrix}\right ]$
Schläfli matrix	$\left [ \begin{smallmatrix} 2 & 0 \\ 0 & 2 \end{smallmatrix}\right ]$	$\left [ \begin{smallmatrix} \ \,2 & -1 \\ -1 & \ \,2 \end{smallmatrix}\right ]$	$\left [ \begin{smallmatrix} \ \,2 & -\sqrt2 \\ -\sqrt2 & \ \,2 \end{smallmatrix}\right ]$	$\left [ \begin{smallmatrix} \ \,2 & -\phi \\ -\phi & \ \,2 \end{smallmatrix}\right ]$	$\left [ \begin{smallmatrix} \ \,2 & -\sqrt3 \\ -\sqrt3 & \ \,2 \end{smallmatrix}\right ]$	$\left [ \begin{smallmatrix} \ \,2 & -2 \\ -2 & \ \,2 \end{smallmatrix}\right ]$	$\left [ \begin{smallmatrix} \ \,2 & -1 & \ \,0 \\ -1 & \ \,2 & -1 \\ \ \,0 & -1 & \ \,2 \end{smallmatrix}\right ]$	$\left [ \begin{smallmatrix} \ \,\ \ 2 & -\sqrt{2} & \ \,0 \\ -\sqrt{2} & \ \,\ \ 2 & -1 \\ \ \,\ \ 0 & \ \,-1 & \ \,2 \end{smallmatrix}\right ]$	$\left [ \begin{smallmatrix} \ \,2 & -1 & \ \,0 & \ \,0 \\ -1 & \ \,2 & -1 & -1 \\ \ \,0 & -1 & \ \,2 & \ \,0 \\ \ \,0 & -1 & \ \,0 & \ \,2 \end{smallmatrix}\right ]$	$\left [ \begin{smallmatrix} \ \,2 & -1 & \ \,0 & -1 \\ -1 & \ \,2 & -1 & \ \,0 \\ \ \,0 & -1 & \ \,2 & -1 \\ -1 & \ \,0 & -1 & \ \,2 \end{smallmatrix}\right ]$

== An example ==
The graph $A_n$ in which vertices $1$ through $n$ are placed in a row with each vertex joined by an unlabelled edge to its immediate neighbors is the Coxeter diagram of the symmetric group $S_{n+1}$; the generators correspond to the transpositions $(1~~2), (2~~3), \dots, (n~~n+1)$. Any two non-consecutive transpositions commute, while multiplying two consecutive transpositions gives a 3-cycle : $(k~~k+1) \cdot (k+1~~k+2) = (k~~k+2~~k+1)$. Therefore $S_{n+1}$ is a quotient of the Coxeter group having Coxeter diagram $A_n$. Further arguments show that this quotient map is an isomorphism.

== Abstraction of reflection groups ==
Coxeter groups are an abstraction of reflection groups. Coxeter groups are abstract groups, in the sense of being given via a presentation. On the other hand, reflection groups are concrete, in the sense that each of its elements is the composite of finitely many geometric reflections about linear hyperplanes in some euclidean space. Technically, a reflection group is a subgroup of a linear group (or various generalizations) generated by orthogonal matrices of determinant -1. Each generator of a Coxeter group has order 2, which abstracts the geometric fact that performing a reflection twice is the identity. Each relation of the form $(r_ir_j)^k$, corresponding to the geometric fact that, given two hyperplanes meeting at an angle of $\pi/k$, the composite of the two reflections about these hyperplanes is a rotation by $2\pi/k$, which has order k.

In this way, every reflection group may be presented as a Coxeter group. The converse is partially true: every finite Coxeter group admits a faithful representation as a finite reflection group of some Euclidean space. However, not every infinite Coxeter group admits a representation as a reflection group.

Finite Coxeter groups have been classified.

== Finite Coxeter groups ==
Coxeter graphs of the irreducible finite Coxeter groups

=== Classification ===
Finite Coxeter groups are classified in terms of their Coxeter diagrams.

The finite Coxeter groups with connected Coxeter diagrams consist of three one-parameter families of increasing dimension ($A_n$ for $n \geq 1$, $B_n$ for $n \geq 2$, and $D_n$ for $n \geq 4$), a one-parameter family of dimension two ($I_2(p)$ for $p \geq 5$), and six exceptional groups ($E_6, E_7, E_8, F_4, H_3,$ and $H_4$). Every finite Coxeter group is the direct product of finitely many of these irreducible groups. (Note: In some contexts, the naming scheme may be extended to allow the following alternative or redundant names: $B_1 \cong A_1$, $D_2 \cong I_2(2) \cong A_1 \times A_1$, $I_2(3) \cong A_2$, $I_2(4) \cong B_2$, $H_2 \cong I_2(5)$, and $D_3 \cong A_3$.)

=== Weyl groups ===
Many, but not all of these, are Weyl groups, and every Weyl group can be realized as a Coxeter group. The Weyl groups are the families $A_n, B_n,$ and $D_n,$ and the exceptions $E_6, E_7, E_8, F_4,$ and $I_2(6),$ denoted in Weyl group notation as $G_2.$

The non-Weyl ones are the exceptions $H_3$ and $H_4,$ and those members of the family $I_2(p)$ that are not exceptionally isomorphic to a Weyl group (namely $I_2(3) \cong A_2, I_2(4) \cong B_2,$ and $I_2(6) \cong G_2$).

This can be proven by comparing the restrictions on (undirected) Dynkin diagrams with the restrictions on Coxeter diagrams of finite groups: formally, the Coxeter graph can be obtained from the Dynkin diagram by discarding the direction of the edges, and replacing every double edge with an edge labelled 4 and every triple edge by an edge labelled 6. Also note that every finitely generated Coxeter group is an automatic group. Dynkin diagrams have the additional restriction that the only permitted edge labels are 2, 3, 4, and 6, which yields the above. Geometrically, this corresponds to the crystallographic restriction theorem, and the fact that excluded polytopes do not fill space or tile the plane – for $H_3,$ the dodecahedron (dually, icosahedron) does not fill space; for $H_4,$ the 120-cell (dually, 600-cell) does not fill space; for $I_2(p)$ a p-gon does not tile the plane except for $p=3, 4,$ or $6$ (the triangular, square, and hexagonal tilings, respectively).

Note further that the (directed) Dynkin diagrams B_{n} and C_{n} give rise to the same Weyl group (hence Coxeter group), because they differ as directed graphs, but agree as undirected graphs – direction matters for root systems but not for the Weyl group; this corresponds to the hypercube and cross-polytope being different regular polytopes but having the same symmetry group.

=== Properties ===
Some properties of the finite irreducible Coxeter groups are given in the following table. The order of a reducible group can be computed by the product of its irreducible subgroup orders.

Rank n	Group symbol	Alternate symbol	Bracket notation	Coxeter graph	Reflections m = 1/2nh	Coxeter number h	Order	Group structure	Related polytopes
1	A_{1}	A_{1}	[ ]		1	2	2	$S_2$	{ }
2	A_{2}	A_{2}	[3]		3	3	6	$S_3\cong D_6\cong \operatorname{GO}^-_2(2)\cong \operatorname{GO}^+_2(4)$	{3}
3	A_{3}	A_{3}	[3,3]		6	4	24	$S_4$	{3,3}
4	A_{4}	A_{4}	[3,3,3]		10	5	120	$S_5$	{3,3,3}
5	A_{5}	A_{5}	[3,3,3,3]		15	6	720	$S_6$	{3,3,3,3}
n	A_{n}	A_{n}	[3^{n−1}]	...	n(n + 1)/2	n + 1	(n + 1)!	$S_{n+1}$	n-simplex
2	B_{2}	C_{2}	[4]		4	4	8	$C_{2}\wr S_{2} \cong D_8\cong \operatorname{GO}^-_2(3)\cong \operatorname{GO}^+_2(5)$	{4}
3	B_{3}	C_{3}	[4,3]		9	6	48	$C_{2}\wr S_{3}\cong S_4\times 2$	{4,3} / {3,4}
4	B_{4}	C_{4}	[4,3,3]		16	8	384	$C_{2}\wr S_{4}$	{4,3,3} / {3,3,4}
5	B_{5}	C_{5}	[4,3,3,3]		25	10	3840	$C_{2}\wr S_{5}$	{4,3,3,3} / {3,3,3,4}
n	B_{n}	C_{n}	[4,3^{n−2}]	...	n^{2}	2n	2^{n} n!	$C_{2}\wr S_{n}$	n-cube / n-orthoplex
4	D_{4}	B_{4}	[3^{1,1,1}]		12	6	192	$C_{2}^3 S_{4}\cong 2^{1+4}\colon S_3$	h{4,3,3} / {3,3^{1,1}}
5	D_{5}	B_{5}	[3^{2,1,1}]		20	8	1920	$C_{2}^4 S_{5}$	h{4,3,3,3} / {3,3,3^{1,1}}
n	D_{n}	B_{n}	[3^{n−3,1,1}]	...	n(n − 1)	2(n − 1)	2^{n−1} n!	$C_{2}^{n-1} S_{n}$	n-demicube / n-orthoplex
6	E_{6}	E_{6}	[3^{2,2,1}]		36	12	51840	$\operatorname{GO}_6^{-}(2) \cong \operatorname{SO}_5(3) \cong \operatorname{PSp}_4(3) \colon 2 \cong \operatorname{PSU}_4(2) \colon 2$	2_{21}, 1_{22}
7	E_{7}	E_{7}	[3^{3,2,1}]		63	18	2903040	$\operatorname{GO}_7(2)\times 2 \cong \operatorname{Sp}_6(2)\times 2$	3_{21}, 2_{31}, 1_{32}
8	E_{8}	E_{8}	[3^{4,2,1}]		120	30	696729600	$2\cdot\operatorname{GO}_8^{+}(2)$	4_{21}, 2_{41}, 1_{42}
4	F_{4}	F_{4}	[3,4,3]		24	12	1152	$\operatorname{GO}^+_4(3)\cong 2^{1+4}\colon(S_3 \times S_3)$	{3,4,3}
2	G_{2}	– (D^{6}_{2})	[6]		6	6	12	$D_{12}\cong \operatorname{GO}^-_2(5)\cong \operatorname{GO}^+_2(7)$	{6}
2	I_{2}(5)	G_{2}	[5]		5	5	10	$D_{10}\cong \operatorname{GO}^-_2(4)$	{5}
3	H_{3}	G_{3}	[3,5]		15	10	120	$2\times A_5$	{3,5} / {5,3}
4	H_{4}	G_{4}	[3,3,5]		60	30	14400	$2\cdot(A_5\times A_5)\colon 2$ (Note: an index 2 subgroup of $\operatorname{GO}^+_4(5)$)	{5,3,3} / {3,3,5}
2	I_{2}(n)	D^{n}_{2}	[n]		n	n	2n	$D_{2n}$ $\cong \operatorname{GO}^-_2(n-1)$ when n = p^{k} + 1, p prime $\cong \operatorname{GO}^+_2(n+1)$ when n = p^{k} − 1, p prime	{p}

=== Symmetry groups of regular polytopes ===
The symmetry group of every regular polytope is a finite Coxeter group. Note that dual polytopes have the same symmetry group.

There are three series of regular polytopes in all dimensions. The symmetry group of a regular n-simplex is the symmetric group S_{n+1}, also known as the Coxeter group of type A_{n}. The symmetry group of the n-cube and its dual, the n-cross-polytope, is B_{n}, and is known as the hyperoctahedral group.

The exceptional regular polytopes in dimensions two, three, and four, correspond to other Coxeter groups. In two dimensions, the dihedral groups, which are the symmetry groups of regular polygons, form the series I_{2}(p), for p ≥ 3. In three dimensions, the symmetry group of the regular dodecahedron and its dual, the regular icosahedron, is H_{3}, known as the full icosahedral group. In four dimensions, there are three exceptional regular polytopes, the 24-cell, the 120-cell, and the 600-cell. The first has symmetry group F_{4}, while the other two are dual and have symmetry group H_{4}.

The Coxeter groups of type D_{n}, E_{6}, E_{7}, and E_{8} are the symmetry groups of certain semiregular polytopes.

== Affine Coxeter groups ==
Coxeter diagrams for the affine Coxeter groups

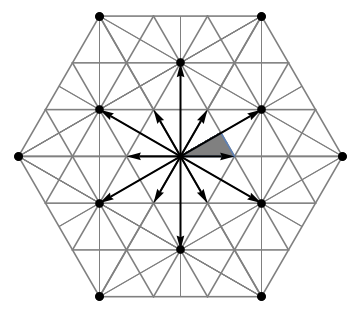
Stiefel diagram for the $G_2$ root system

The affine Coxeter groups form a second important series of Coxeter groups. These are not finite themselves, but each contains a normal abelian subgroup such that the corresponding quotient group is finite. In each case, the quotient group is itself a Coxeter group, and the Coxeter graph of the affine Coxeter group is obtained from the Coxeter graph of the quotient group by adding another vertex and one or two additional edges. For example, for n ≥ 2, the graph consisting of n+1 vertices in a circle is obtained from A_{n} in this way, and the corresponding Coxeter group is the affine Weyl group of A_{n} (the affine symmetric group). For n = 2, this can be pictured as a subgroup of the symmetry group of the standard tiling of the plane by equilateral triangles.

In general, given a root system, one can construct the associated Stiefel diagram, consisting of the hyperplanes orthogonal to the roots along with certain translates of these hyperplanes. The affine Coxeter group (or affine Weyl group) is then the group generated by the (affine) reflections about all the hyperplanes in the diagram. The Stiefel diagram divides the plane into infinitely many connected components called alcoves, and the affine Coxeter group acts freely and transitively on the alcoves, just as the ordinary Weyl group acts freely and transitively on the Weyl chambers. The figure at right illustrates the Stiefel diagram for the $G_2$ root system.

Suppose $R$ is an irreducible root system of rank $r>1$ and let $\alpha_1,\ldots,\alpha_r$ be a collection of simple roots. Let, also, $\alpha_{r+1}$ denote the highest root. Then the affine Coxeter group is generated by the ordinary (linear) reflections about the hyperplanes perpendicular to $\alpha_1,\ldots,\alpha_r$, together with an affine reflection about a translate of the hyperplane perpendicular to $\alpha_{r+1}$. The Coxeter graph for the affine Weyl group is the Coxeter–Dynkin diagram for $R$, together with one additional node associated to $\alpha_{r+1}$. In this case, one alcove of the Stiefel diagram may be obtained by taking the fundamental Weyl chamber and cutting it by a translate of the hyperplane perpendicular to $\alpha_{r+1}$.

A list of the affine Coxeter groups follows:

Group symbol	Witt symbol	Bracket notation	Coxeter graph	Related uniform tessellation(s)
${\tilde{A}}_n$	$P_{n+1}$	[3^{[n+1]}]	... or...	Simplectic honeycomb
${\tilde{B}}_n$	$S_{n+1}$	[4,3^{n − 3},3^{1,1}]	...	Demihypercubic honeycomb
${\tilde{C}}_n$	$R_{n+1}$	[4,3^{n−2},4]	...	Hypercubic honeycomb
${\tilde{D}}_n$	$Q_{n+1}$	[ 3^{1,1},3^{n−4},3^{1,1}]	...	Demihypercubic honeycomb
${\tilde{E}}_6$	$T_{7}$	[3^{2,2,2}]	or	2_{22}
${\tilde{E}}_7$	$T_{8}$	[3^{3,3,1}]	or	3_{31}, 1_{33}
${\tilde{E}}_8$	$T_{9}$	[3^{5,2,1}]		5_{21}, 2_{51}, 1_{52}
${\tilde{F}}_4$	$U_{5}$	[3,4,3,3]		16-cell honeycomb 24-cell honeycomb
${\tilde{G}}_2$	$V_{3}$	[6,3]		Hexagonal tiling and Triangular tiling
${\tilde{A}}_1 = I_2(\infty)$	$W_{2}$	[∞]		Apeirogon

The group symbol subscript is one less than the number of nodes in each case, since each of these groups was obtained by adding a node to a finite group's graph.

== Hyperbolic Coxeter groups ==
There are infinitely many hyperbolic Coxeter groups describing reflection groups in hyperbolic space, notably including the hyperbolic triangle groups.

== Irreducible Coxeter groups ==
A Coxeter group is said to be irreducible if its Coxeter–Dynkin diagram is connected. Every Coxeter group is the direct product of the irreducible groups that correspond to the components of its Coxeter–Dynkin diagram.

== Partial orders ==
A choice of reflection generators gives rise to a length function ℓ on a Coxeter group, namely the minimum number of uses of generators required to express a group element; this is precisely the length in the word metric in the Cayley graph. An expression for v using ℓ(v) generators is a reduced word. For example, the permutation (13) in S_{3} has two reduced words, (12)(23)(12) and (23)(12)(23). The function $v \to (-1)^{\ell(v)}$ defines a map $G \to \{\pm 1\},$ generalizing the sign map for the symmetric group.

Using reduced words one may define three partial orders on the Coxeter group, the (right) weak order, the absolute order and the Bruhat order (named for François Bruhat). An element v exceeds an element u in the Bruhat order if some (or equivalently, any) reduced word for v contains a reduced word for u as a substring, where some letters (in any position) are dropped. In the weak order, v ≥ u if some reduced word for v contains a reduced word for u as an initial segment. Indeed, the word length makes this into a graded poset. The Hasse diagrams corresponding to these orders are objects of study, and are related to the Cayley graph determined by the generators. The absolute order is defined analogously to the weak order, but with generating set/alphabet consisting of all conjugates of the Coxeter generators.

For example, the permutation (1 2 3) in S_{3} has only one reduced word, (12)(23), so covers (12) and (23) in the Bruhat order but only covers (12) in the weak order.

== Homology ==
Since a Coxeter group $W$ is generated by finitely many elements of order 2, its abelianization is an elementary abelian 2-group, i.e., it is isomorphic to the direct sum of several copies of the cyclic group $Z_2$. This may be restated in terms of the first homology group of $W$.

The Schur multiplier $M(W)$, equal to the second homology group of $W$, was computed in (Ihara & Yokonuma 1965) for finite reflection groups and in (Yokonuma 1965) for affine reflection groups, with a more unified account given in (Howlett 1988). In all cases, the Schur multiplier is also an elementary abelian 2-group. For each infinite family $\{W_n\}$ of finite or affine Weyl groups, the rank of $M(W_n)$ stabilizes as $n$ goes to infinity.

== See also ==
- Artin–Tits group
- Chevalley–Shephard–Todd theorem
- Complex reflection group
- Coxeter element
- Isomorphism problem of Coxeter groups
- Iwahori–Hecke algebra, a quantum deformation of the group algebra
- Kazhdan–Lusztig polynomial
- Longest element of a Coxeter group
- Parabolic subgroup of a reflection group
- Supersolvable arrangement

== Bibliography ==
- Hall, Brian C. (2015). Lie groups, Lie algebras, and representations: An elementary introduction. Graduate Texts in Mathematics. Vol. 222 (2nd ed.). Springer. ISBN 978-3-319-13466-6.
- Ihara, S.; Yokonuma, Takeo (1965). "On the second cohomology groups (Schur-multipliers) of finite reflection groups" (PDF). J. Fac. Sci. Univ. Tokyo, Sect. 1. 11: 155–171. Zbl 0136.28802. Archived from the original (PDF) on 2013-10-23.
- Howlett, Robert B. (1988). "On the Schur Multipliers of Coxeter Groups". J. London Math. Soc. 2. 38 (2): 263–276. doi:10.1112/jlms/s2-38.2.263. Zbl 0627.20019.
- Yokonuma, Takeo (1965). "On the second cohomology groups (Schur-multipliers) of infinite discrete reflection groups". J. Fac. Sci. Univ. Tokyo, Sect. 1. 11: 173–186. hdl:2261/6049. Zbl 0136.28803.
