= Cup product =

Operation in cohomology theory

In mathematics, specifically in algebraic topology, the cup product is a method of adjoining two cocycles of degree $p$ and $q$ to form a composite cocycle of degree $p+q$. This defines an associative (and distributive) graded commutative product operation in cohomology, turning the cohomology of a space $X$ into a graded ring, $H^*(X)$, called the cohomology ring. The cup product was introduced in work of J. W. Alexander, Eduard Čech and Hassler Whitney from 1935–1938, and, in full generality, by Samuel Eilenberg in 1944.

== Definition ==
In singular cohomology, the cup product is a construction giving a product on the graded cohomology ring $H^*(X)$ of a topological space $X$.

The construction starts with a product of cochains: if $\alpha^p$ is a $p$-cochain and $\beta^q$ is a $q$-cochain, then

$$(\alpha^p \smile \beta^q)(\sigma) = \alpha^p(\sigma \circ \iota_{0,1, ... p}) \cdot \beta^q(\sigma \circ \iota_{p,p+1, ..., p + q})$$

where $\sigma$ is a singular $(p+q)$-simplex and $\iota_S , S \subset \{0,1,...,p+q \}$ is the canonical embedding of the simplex spanned by $S$ into the $(p+q)$-simplex whose vertices are indexed by $\{0,...,p+q \}$.

Informally, $\sigma \circ \iota_{0,1, ..., p}$ is the $p$-th front face and $\sigma \circ \iota_{p, p+1, ..., p + q}$ is the $q$-th back face of $\sigma$, respectively.

The coboundary of the cup product of cochains $\alpha^p$ and $\beta^q$ is given by

$$\delta(\alpha^p \smile \beta^q) = \delta{\alpha^p} \smile \beta^q + (-1)^p(\alpha^p \smile \delta{\beta^q}).$$

The cup product of two cocycles is again a cocycle, and the product of a coboundary with a cocycle (in either order) is a coboundary. The cup product operation induces a bilinear operation on cohomology,

$$H^p(X) \times H^q(X) \to H^{p+q}(X).$$

== Properties ==
The cup product operation in cohomology satisfies the identity

$$\alpha^p \smile \beta^q = (-1)^{pq}(\beta^q \smile \alpha^p)$$

so that the corresponding multiplication is graded-commutative.

The cup product is functorial, in the following sense: if

$$f\colon X\to Y$$

is a continuous function, and

$$f^*\colon H^*(Y)\to H^*(X)$$

is the induced homomorphism in cohomology, then

$$f^*(\alpha \smile \beta) =f^*(\alpha) \smile f^*(\beta),$$

for all classes $\alpha,\beta$ in $H^*(Y)$. In other words, $f^*$ is a (graded) ring homomorphism.

== Interpretation ==
It is possible to view the cup product $\smile \colon H^p(X) \times H^q(X) \to H^{p+q}(X)$ as a mapping induced from the following composition:

$$\displaystyle C^\bullet(X) \times C^\bullet(X) \to C^\bullet(X \times X) \overset{\Delta^*}{\to} C^\bullet(X)$$

in terms of the chain complexes of $X$ and $X \times X$, where the first map is the Künneth map and the second is the map induced by the diagonal $\Delta \colon X \to X \times X$.

This composition passes to the quotient to give a well-defined map in terms of cohomology, and this is the cup product. This approach explains the existence of a cup product for cohomology but not for homology: $\Delta \colon X \to X \times X$ induces a map $\Delta^* \colon H^\bullet(X \times X) \to H^\bullet(X)$ but would also induce a map $\Delta_* \colon H_\bullet(X) \to H_\bullet(X \times X)$, which goes the wrong way round to allow us to define a product. This is however of use in defining the cap product.

Bilinearity follows from this presentation of cup product, i.e. $(u_1 + u_2) \smile v = u_1 \smile v + u_2 \smile v$ and $u \smile (v_1 + v_2) = u \smile v_1 + u \smile v_2.$

== Examples ==
Cup products may be used to distinguish manifolds from wedges of spaces with identical cohomology groups. The space $X:= S^2\vee S^1\vee S^1$ has the same cohomology groups as the torus T, but with a different cup product. In the case of X the multiplication of the cochains associated to the copies of $S^1$ is degenerate, whereas in T multiplication in the first cohomology group can be used to decompose the torus as a 2-cell diagram, thus having product equal to Z (more generally M where this is the base module).

== Other definitions ==
=== Cup product and differential forms ===
In de Rham cohomology, the cup product of differential forms is induced by the wedge product. In other words, the wedge product of two closed differential forms belongs to the de Rham class of the cup product of the two original de Rham classes.

=== Cup product and geometric intersections ===
The linking number can be defined in terms of a non-vanishing cup product on the complement of a link. The complement of these two linked circles in $\mathbb{R}^3$ deformation retracts to a wedge sum of a torus and 2-sphere, which has a non-vanishing cup product in degree 1.

For oriented manifolds, there is a geometric heuristic that "the cup product is dual to intersections."

Indeed, let $M$ be an oriented smooth manifold of dimension $n$. If two submanifolds $A,B$ of codimension $i$ and $j$ intersect transversely, then their intersection $A \cap B$ is again a submanifold of codimension $i+j$. By taking the images of the fundamental homology classes of these manifolds under inclusion, one can obtain a bilinear product on homology. This product is Poincaré dual to the cup product, in the sense that taking the Poincaré pairings $[A]^*, [B]^* \in H^{i},H^{j}$ then there is the following equality:

$[A]^* \smile [B]^*=[A \cap B]^* \in H^{i+j}(X, \mathbb Z)$.

Similarly, the linking number can be defined in terms of intersections, shifting dimensions by 1, or alternatively in terms of a non-vanishing cup product on the complement of a link.

== Massey products ==
Massey products generalize cup product, allowing one to define "higher order linking numbers", the Milnor invariants.

The cup product is a binary (2-ary) operation; one can define a ternary (3-ary) and higher order operation called the Massey product, which generalizes the cup product. This is a higher order cohomology operation, which is only partly defined (only defined for some triples).

== See also ==
- Singular homology
- Homology theory
- Cap product
- Torelli group
