= Hermann Künneth =

German mathematician and algebraic topologist

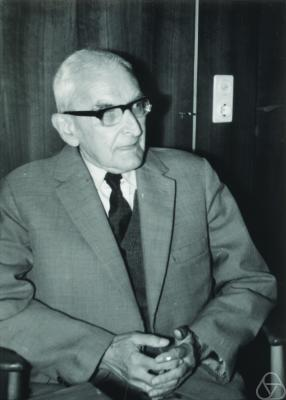
- Hemann Künneth in Erlangen, 1969
- Born: July 6, 1892; Neustadt an der Haardt
- Died: May 7, 1975 (aged 82); Erlangen
- Known for: Künneth theorem
- Awards: Bundesverdienstkreuz am Bande
- Scientific career
- Fields: Mathematics, Algebraic Topology
- Institutions: University of Erlangen
- Thesis: Über die Bettischen Zahlen einer Produktmannigfaltigkeit (1922)
- Doctoral advisor: Heinrich Franz Friedrich Tietze

Hermann Lorenz Künneth (July 6, 1892 Neustadt an der Haardt – May 7, 1975 Erlangen) was a German mathematician and renowned algebraic topologist best known for his contribution to what is now known as the Künneth theorem.

In the winter semester of 1910/11, Künneth joined the students' fraternity known as “Studentengesangverein Erlangen“, now known as "Akademisch-Musikalische Verbindung Fridericiana Erlangen"(“Students' Choral Society Erlangen“, now “Akademic Musical Fraternity Fridericiana Erlangen“). He carried out a variety of posts during his studies, as well as after having left university in 1914.

He participated in the First World War and was captured by British forces.

His 1922 doctoral thesis at the University of Erlangen was titled Über die Bettischen Zahlen einer Produktmannigfaltigkeit (“On the Betti numbers of a product manifold”), it was supervised by Heinrich Franz Friedrich Tietze.

From 1923, he was a teacher at secondary schools in Kronach and Erlangen. After retiring, he became professor at the University of Erlangen.

In 1964, he was decorated with the Bundesverdienstkreuz, the highest German decoration.

== Literature ==
- Haupt, Otto: “Hermann Künneth zum Gedenken”, Jahresbericht der Deutschen Mathematiker-Vereinigung, 78 (1976) pp. 61–66 (online)
- Haas, Karl Eduard: “Die Akademisch-Musikalische Verbindung Fridericiana im Sondershäuser Verband“, Erlangen 1982, p. 295
