= Length of a Weyl group element =

In mathematics, the length of an element w in a Weyl group W, denoted by l(w), is the smallest number k so that w is a product of k reflections by simple roots. (So, the notion depends on the choice of a positive Weyl chamber.) In particular, a simple reflection has length one. The function l is then an integer-valued function of W; it is a length function of W. It follows immediately from the definition that l(w^{−1}) = l(w) and that l(ww'^{−1}) ≤ l(w) + l(w' ).
