= Fundamental class =

Homology class in mathematics

In mathematics, the fundamental class is a homology class [M] associated to a connected orientable compact manifold of dimension n, which corresponds to the generator of the homology group $H_n(M,\partial M;\mathbb{Z})\cong\mathbb{Z}$ . The fundamental class can be thought of as the orientation of the top-dimensional simplices of a suitable triangulation of the manifold.

== Definition ==
=== Closed, orientable ===
When M is a connected orientable closed manifold of dimension n, the top homology group is infinite cyclic: $H_n(M;\mathbb{Z}) \cong \mathbb{Z}$, and an orientation is a choice of generator, a choice of isomorphism $\mathbb{Z} \to H_n(M;\mathbb{Z})$. The generator is called the fundamental class.

If M is disconnected (but still orientable), a fundamental class is the direct sum of the fundamental classes for each connected component (corresponding to an orientation for each component).

In relation with de Rham cohomology it represents integration over M; namely for M a smooth manifold, an n-form ω can be paired with the fundamental class as

$$\langle\omega, [M]\rangle = \int_M \omega\ ,$$

which is the integral of ω over M, and depends only on the cohomology class of ω.

=== Stiefel–Whitney class ===
If M is not orientable, $H_n(M;\mathbb{Z}) \ncong \mathbb{Z}$, and so one cannot define a fundamental class M living inside the integers. However, every closed manifold is $\mathbb{Z}_2$-orientable, and $H_n(M;\mathbb{Z}_2)=\mathbb{Z}_2$ (for M connected). Thus, every closed manifold is $\mathbb{Z}_2$-oriented (not just orientable: there is no ambiguity in choice of orientation), and has a $\mathbb{Z}_2$-fundamental class.

This $\mathbb{Z}_2$-fundamental class is used in defining Stiefel–Whitney class.

=== With boundary ===
If M is a compact orientable manifold with boundary, then the top relative homology group is again infinite cyclic $H_n(M,\partial M)\cong \mathbb{Z}$, and so the notion of the fundamental class can be extended to the manifold with boundary case.

== Poincaré duality ==
The Poincaré duality theorem relates the homology and cohomology groups of n-dimensional oriented closed manifolds: if R is a commutative ring and M is an n-dimensional R-orientable closed manifold with fundamental class [M], then for all k, the map

$$H^k(M;R) \to H_{n-k}(M;R)$$

given by the cap product

$$\alpha \mapsto [M] \frown \alpha$$

is an isomorphism.

Using the notion of fundamental class for manifolds with boundary, we can extend Poincaré duality to that case too (see Lefschetz duality). In fact, the cap product with a fundamental class gives a stronger duality result saying that we have isomorphisms $H^q(M, A;R) \cong H_{n-q}(M, B;R)$, assuming we have that $A, B$ are $(n-1)$-dimensional manifolds with $\partial A=\partial B= A\cap B$ and $\partial M=A\cup B$.

See also Twisted Poincaré duality

== Applications ==
In the Bruhat decomposition of the flag variety of a Lie group, the fundamental class corresponds to the top-dimension Schubert cell, or equivalently the longest element of a Coxeter group.

== See also ==
- Longest element of a Coxeter group
- Poincaré duality
- Virtual fundamental class

== Sources ==
- Hatcher, Allen (2002). Algebraic Topology (1st ed.). Cambridge: Cambridge University Press. ISBN 9780521795401. MR 1867354.
