= Weyl group =

Subgroup of a root system's isometry group

In mathematics, in particular the theory of Lie algebras, the Weyl group (named after Hermann Weyl) of a root system Φ is a subgroup of the isometry group of that root system. Specifically, it is the subgroup which is generated by reflections through the hyperplanes orthogonal to at least one of the roots, and as such is a finite reflection group. In fact it turns out that most finite reflection groups are Weyl groups. Abstractly, Weyl groups are finite Coxeter groups, and are important examples of these.

The Weyl group of a semisimple Lie group, a semisimple Lie algebra, a semisimple linear algebraic group, etc. is the Weyl group of the root system of that group or algebra.

== Definition and examples ==
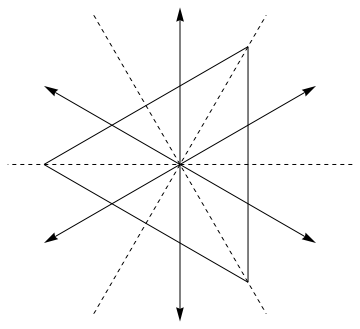
The Weyl group of the $A_2$ root system is the symmetry group of an equilateral triangle

Let $\Phi$ be a root system in a Euclidean space $V$. For each root $\alpha\in\Phi$, let $s_\alpha$ denote the reflection about the hyperplane perpendicular to $\alpha$, which is given explicitly as

$$s_\alpha(v)=v-2\frac{(v,\alpha)}{(\alpha,\alpha)}\alpha$$,

where $(\cdot,\cdot)$ is the inner product on $V$. The Weyl group $W$ of $\Phi$ is the subgroup of the orthogonal group $O(V)$ generated by all the $s_\alpha$'s. By the definition of a root system, each $s_\alpha$ preserves $\Phi$, from which it follows that $W$ is a finite group.

In the case of the $A_2$ root system, for example, the hyperplanes perpendicular to the roots are just lines, and the Weyl group is the symmetry group of an equilateral triangle, as indicated in the figure. As a group, $W$ is isomorphic to the permutation group on three elements, which we may think of as the vertices of the triangle. Note that in this case, $W$ is not the full symmetry group of the root system; a 60-degree rotation preserves $\Phi$ but is not an element of $W$.

We may consider also the $A_n$ root system. In this case, $V$ is the space of all vectors in $\mathbb R^{n+1}$ whose entries sum to zero. The roots consist of the vectors of the form $e_i-e_j,\,i\neq j$, where $e_i$ is the $i$th standard basis element for $\mathbb R^{n+1}$. The reflection associated to such a root is the transformation of $V$ obtained by interchanging the $i$th and $j$th entries of each vector. The Weyl group for $A_n$ is then the permutation group on $n+1$ elements.

== Weyl chambers ==
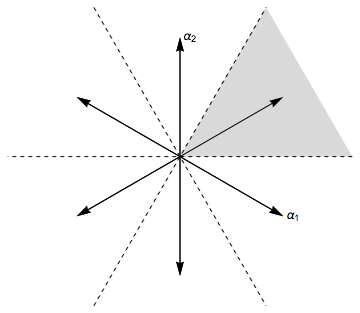
The shaded region is the fundamental Weyl chamber for the base $\{\alpha_1,\alpha_2\}$

If $\Phi\subset V$ is a root system, we may consider the hyperplane perpendicular to each root $\alpha$. Recall that $s_\alpha$ denotes the reflection about the hyperplane and that the Weyl group is the group of transformations of $V$ generated by all the $s_\alpha$'s. The complement of the set of hyperplanes is disconnected, and each connected component is called a Weyl chamber. If we have fixed a particular set Δ of simple roots, we may define the fundamental Weyl chamber associated to Δ as the set of points $v\in V$ such that $(\alpha,v)>0$ for all $\alpha\in\Delta$.

Since the reflections $s_\alpha,\,\alpha\in\Phi$ preserve $\Phi$, they also preserve the set of hyperplanes perpendicular to the roots. Thus, each Weyl group element permutes the Weyl chambers.

The figure illustrates the case of the A2 root system. The "hyperplanes" (in this case, one dimensional) orthogonal to the roots are indicated by dashed lines. The six 60-degree sectors are the Weyl chambers and the shaded region is the fundamental Weyl chamber associated to the indicated base.

A basic general theorem about Weyl chambers is this:

Theorem: The Weyl group acts freely and transitively on the Weyl chambers. Thus, the order of the Weyl group is equal to the number of Weyl chambers.

A related result is this one:

Theorem: Fix a Weyl chamber $C$. Then for all $v\in V$, the Weyl-orbit of $v$ contains exactly one point in the closure $\bar C$ of $C$.

== Coxeter group structure ==
=== Generating set ===
A key result about the Weyl group is this:

Theorem: If $\Delta$ is base for $\Phi$, then the Weyl group is generated by the reflections $s_\alpha$ with $\alpha$ in $\Delta$.

That is to say, the group generated by the reflections $s_\alpha,\,\alpha\in\Delta,$ is the same as the group generated by the reflections $s_\alpha,\,\alpha\in\Phi$.

=== Relations ===
Meanwhile, if $\alpha$ and $\beta$ are in $\Delta$, then the Dynkin diagram for $\Phi$ relative to the base $\Delta$ tells us something about how the pair $\{s_\alpha,s_\beta\}$ behaves. Specifically, suppose $v$ and $v'$ are the corresponding vertices in the Dynkin diagram. Then we have the following results:

- If there is no bond between $v$ and $v'$, then $s_\alpha$ and $s_\beta$ commute. Since $s_\alpha$ and $s_\beta$ each have order two, this is equivalent to saying that $(s_\alpha s_\beta)^2=1$.
- If there is one bond between $v$ and $v'$, then $(s_\alpha s_\beta)^3=1$.
- If there are two bonds between $v$ and $v'$, then $(s_\alpha s_\beta)^4=1$.
- If there are three bonds between $v$ and $v'$, then $(s_\alpha s_\beta)^6=1$.

The preceding claim is not hard to verify, if we simply remember what the Dynkin diagram tells us about the angle between each pair of roots. If, for example, there is no bond between the two vertices, then $\alpha$ and $\beta$ are orthogonal, from which it follows easily that the corresponding reflections commute. More generally, the number of bonds determines the angle $\theta$ between the roots. The product of the two reflections is then a rotation by angle $2\theta$ in the plane spanned by $\alpha$ and $\beta$, as the reader may verify, from which the above claim follows easily.

=== As a Coxeter group ===
Weyl groups are examples of finite reflection groups, as they are generated by reflections; the abstract groups (not considered as subgroups of a linear group) are accordingly finite Coxeter groups, which allows them to be classified by their Coxeter–Dynkin diagram. Being a Coxeter group means that a Weyl group has a special kind of presentation in which each generator x_{i} is of order two, and the relations other than x_{i}^{2}=1 are of the form (x_{i}x_{j})^{m_{ij}}=1. The generators are the reflections given by simple roots, and m_{ij} is 2, 3, 4, or 6 depending on whether roots i and j make an angle of 90, 120, 135, or 150 degrees, i.e., whether in the Dynkin diagram they are unconnected, connected by a simple edge, connected by a double edge, or connected by a triple edge. We have already noted these relations in the bullet points above, but to say that $W$ is a Coxeter group, we are saying that those are the only relations in $W$.

Weyl groups have a Bruhat order and length function in terms of this presentation: the length of a Weyl group element is the length of the shortest word representing that element in terms of these standard generators. There is a unique longest element of a Coxeter group, which is opposite to the identity in the Bruhat order.

== Weyl groups in algebraic, group-theoretic, and geometric settings ==
Above, the Weyl group was defined as a subgroup of the isometry group of a root system. There are also various definitions of Weyl groups specific to various group-theoretic and geometric contexts (Lie algebra, Lie group, symmetric space, etc.). For each of these ways of defining Weyl groups, it is a (usually nontrivial) theorem that it is a Weyl group in the sense of the definition at the top of this article, namely the Weyl group of some root system associated with the object. A concrete realization of such a Weyl group usually depends on a choice – e.g. of Cartan subalgebra for a Lie algebra, of maximal torus for a Lie group.

=== The Weyl group of a connected compact Lie group ===
Let $K$ be a connected compact Lie group and let $T$ be a maximal torus in $K$. We then introduce the normalizer of $T$ in $K$, denoted $N(T)$ and defined as

$$N(T)=\{x\in K|xtx^{-1}\in T,\,\text{for all }t\in T\}$$.

We also define the centralizer of $T$ in $K$, denoted $Z(T)$ and defined as

$$Z(T)=\{x\in K|xtx^{-1}=t\,\text{for all }t\in T\}$$.

The Weyl group $W$ of $K$ (relative to the given maximal torus $T$) is then defined initially as

$$W=N(T)/T$$.

Eventually, one proves that $Z(T)=T$, at which point one has an alternative description of the Weyl group as

$$W=N(T)/Z(T)$$.

Now, one can define a root system $\Phi$ associated to the pair $(K,T)$; the roots are the nonzero weights of the adjoint action of $T$ on the Lie algebra of $K$. For each $\alpha\in\Phi$, one can construct an element $x_\alpha$ of $N(T)$ whose action on $T$ has the form of reflection. With a bit more effort, one can show that these reflections generate all of $N(T)/Z(T)$. Thus, in the end, the Weyl group as defined as $N(T)/T$ or $N(T)/Z(T)$ is isomorphic to the Weyl group of the root system $\Phi$.

=== In other settings ===
For a complex semisimple Lie algebra, the Weyl group is simply defined as the reflection group generated by reflections in the roots – the specific realization of the root system depending on a choice of Cartan subalgebra.

For a Lie group G satisfying certain conditions, (Note: Different conditions are sufficient – most simply if G is connected and either compact, or an affine algebraic group. The definition is simpler for a semisimple (or more generally reductive) Lie group over an algebraically closed field, but a relative Weyl group can be defined for a split Lie group.) given a torus T < G (which need not be maximal), the Weyl group with respect to that torus is defined as the quotient of the normalizer of the torus N = N(T) = N_{G}(T) by the centralizer of the torus Z = Z(T) = Z_{G}(T),

$$W(T,G) := N(T)/Z(T).\$$

The group W is finite – Z is of finite index in N. If T = T_{0} is a maximal torus (so it equals its own centralizer: $Z(T_0) = T_0$) then the resulting quotient N/Z = N/T is called the Weyl group of G, and denoted W(G). Note that the specific quotient set depends on a choice of maximal torus, but the resulting groups are all isomorphic (by an inner automorphism of G), since maximal tori are conjugate.

If G is compact and connected, and T is a maximal torus, then the Weyl group of G is isomorphic to the Weyl group of its Lie algebra, as discussed above.

For example, for the general linear group GL, a maximal torus is the subgroup D of invertible diagonal matrices, whose normalizer is the generalized permutation matrices (matrices in the form of permutation matrices, but with any non-zero numbers in place of the '1's), and whose Weyl group is the symmetric group. In this case the quotient map N → N/T splits (via the permutation matrices), so the normalizer N is a semidirect product of the torus and the Weyl group, and the Weyl group can be expressed as a subgroup of G. In general this is not always the case – the quotient does not always split, the normalizer N is not always the semidirect product of W and Z, and the Weyl group cannot always be realized as a subgroup of G.

== Bruhat decomposition ==
If B is a Borel subgroup of G, i.e., a maximal connected solvable subgroup and a maximal torus T = T_{0} is chosen to lie in B, then we obtain the Bruhat decomposition

$$G = \bigcup_{w\in W} BwB$$

which gives rise to the decomposition of the flag variety G/B into Schubert cells (see Grassmannian).

The structure of the Hasse diagram of the group is related geometrically to the cohomology of the manifold (rather, of the real and complex forms of the group), which is constrained by Poincaré duality. Thus algebraic properties of the Weyl group correspond to general topological properties of manifolds. For instance, Poincaré duality gives a pairing between cells in dimension k and in dimension n - k (where n is the dimension of a manifold): the bottom (0) dimensional cell corresponds to the identity element of the Weyl group, and the dual top-dimensional cell corresponds to the longest element of a Coxeter group.

== Analogy with algebraic groups ==
There are a number of analogies between algebraic groups and Weyl groups – for instance, the number of elements of the symmetric group is n!, and the number of elements of the general linear group over a finite field is related to the q-factorial $[n]_q!$; thus the symmetric group behaves as though it were a linear group over "the field with one element". This is formalized by the field with one element, which considers Weyl groups to be simple algebraic groups over the field with one element.

== Cohomology ==
For a non-abelian connected compact Lie group G, the first group cohomology of the Weyl group W with coefficients in the maximal torus T used to define it, (Note: W acts on T – that is how it is defined – and the group $H^1(W; T)$ means "with respect to this action".) is related to the outer automorphism group of the normalizer $N = N_G(T),$ as:

$$\operatorname{Out}(N) \cong H^1(W; T) \rtimes \operatorname{Out}(G).$$

The outer automorphisms of the group Out(G) are essentially the diagram automorphisms of the Dynkin diagram, while the group cohomology is computed in Hämmerli, Matthey & Suter 2004 and is a finite elementary abelian 2-group ($(\mathbf{Z}/2)^k$); for simple Lie groups it has order 1, 2, or 4. The 0th and 2nd group cohomology are also closely related to the normalizer.

== See also ==
- Affine Weyl group
- Hasse diagram
- Maximal torus
- Root system of a semi-simple Lie algebra
- Semisimple Lie algebra#Cartan subalgebras and root systems
