= Bruhat decomposition =

Mathematical term

In mathematics, the Bruhat decomposition (introduced by François Bruhat for classical groups and by Claude Chevalley in general) $G=BWB$ of certain algebraic groups $G=BWB$ into cells can be regarded as a general expression of the principle of Gauss–Jordan elimination, which generically writes a matrix as a product of an upper triangular and lower triangular matrices—but with exceptional cases. It is related to the Schubert cell decomposition of flag varieties: see Weyl group for this.

More generally, any group with a (B, N) pair has a Bruhat decomposition.

== Definitions ==
- $G$ is a connected, reductive algebraic group over an algebraically closed field.
- $B$ is a Borel subgroup of $G$
- $W$ is a Weyl group of $G$ corresponding to a maximal torus of $B$.

The Bruhat decomposition of $G$ is the decomposition

$$G=BWB =\bigsqcup_{w\in W}BwB$$

of $G$ as a disjoint union of double cosets of $B$ parameterized by the elements of the Weyl group $W$. (Note that although $W$ is not in general a subgroup of $G$, the coset $wB$ is still well defined because the maximal torus is contained in $B$.)

== Examples ==
Let $G$ be the general linear group GL_{n} of invertible $n \times n$ matrices with entries in some algebraically closed field, which is a reductive group. Then the Weyl group $W$ is isomorphic to the symmetric group $S_n$ on $n$ letters, with permutation matrices as representatives. In this case, we can take $B$ to be the subgroup of upper triangular invertible matrices, so Bruhat decomposition says that one can write any invertible matrix $A$ as a product $U_1PU_2$ where $U_1$ and $U_2$ are upper triangular, and $P$ is a permutation matrix. Writing this as $P=U_{1}^{-1}AU_{2}^{-1}$, this says that any invertible matrix can be transformed into a permutation matrix via a series of row and column operations, where we are only allowed to add row $i$ (resp. column $i$) to row $j$ (resp. column $j$) if $i>j$ (resp. $i<j$). The row operations correspond to $U_{1}^{-1}$, and the column operations correspond to $U_{2}^{-1}$.

The special linear group SL_{n} of invertible $n \times n$ matrices with determinant $1$ is a semisimple group, and hence reductive. In this case, $W$ is still isomorphic to the symmetric group $S_n$. However, the determinant of a permutation matrix is the sign of the permutation, so to represent an odd permutation in SL_{n}, we can take one of the nonzero elements to be $-1$ instead of $1$. Here $B$ is the subgroup of upper triangular matrices with determinant $1$, so the interpretation of Bruhat decomposition in this case is similar to the case of GL_{n}.

== Geometry ==
The cells in the Bruhat decomposition correspond to the Schubert cell decomposition of flag varieties. The dimension of the cells corresponds to the length of the word $w$ in the Weyl group. Poincaré duality constrains the topology of the cell decomposition, and thus the algebra of the Weyl group; for instance, the top dimensional cell is unique (it represents the fundamental class), and corresponds to the longest element of a Coxeter group.

== Computations ==
The number of cells in a given dimension of the Bruhat decomposition are the coefficients of the $q$-polynomial of the associated Dynkin diagram.

== Double Bruhat cells ==
With two opposite Borel subgroups, one may intersect the Bruhat cells for each of them, giving a further decomposition
$$G=\bigsqcup_{w_1 , w_2\in W} ( Bw_1 B \cap B_- w_2 B_- ).$$

== See also ==
- Lie group decompositions
- Birkhoff factorization, a special case of the Bruhat decomposition for affine groups.
- Cluster algebra
