= Cap product =

Method in algebraic topology

In algebraic topology the cap product is a method of adjoining a chain of degree $p$ with a cochain of degree $q$, such that $q\leq p$, to form a composite chain of degree $p-q$. It was introduced by Eduard Čech in 1936, and independently by Hassler Whitney in 1938.

== Definition ==
Let X be a topological space and R a coefficient ring. The cap product is a bilinear map on singular homology and cohomology

$$\frown\;: H_p(X;R)\times H^q(X;R) \rightarrow H_{p-q}(X;R).$$

defined by contracting a singular chain $\sigma : \Delta^p \rightarrow X$ with a singular cochain $\psi \in C^q(X;R),$ by the formula:

$$\sigma \frown \psi = \psi(\sigma|_{[v_0, \ldots, v_q]}) \sigma|_{[v_q, \ldots, v_p]}.$$

Here, the notation $\sigma|_{[v_0, \ldots, v_q]}$ indicates the restriction of the simplicial map $\sigma$ to its face spanned by the vectors of the base.

== Interpretation ==
In analogy with the interpretation of the cup product in terms of the Künneth formula, we can explain the existence of the cap product in the following way. Using CW approximation we may assume that $X$ is a CW-complex and $C_\bullet(X)$ (and $C^\bullet(X)$) is the complex of its cellular chains (or cochains, respectively). Consider then the composition
$$C_\bullet(X) \otimes C^\bullet(X) \overset{\Delta_* \otimes \mathrm{Id}}{\longrightarrow} C_\bullet(X) \otimes C_\bullet(X) \otimes C^\bullet(X) \overset{\mathrm{Id} \otimes \varepsilon}{\longrightarrow} C_\bullet(X)$$
where we are taking tensor products of chain complexes, $\Delta \colon X \to X \times X$ is the diagonal map which induces the map
$$\Delta_* \colon C_\bullet(X)\to C_\bullet(X \times X)\cong C_\bullet(X)\otimes C_\bullet(X)$$
on the chain complex, and $\varepsilon \colon C_p(X) \otimes C^q(X) \to \mathbb{Z}$ is the evaluation map (always 0 except for $p=q$).

This composition then passes to the quotient to define the cap product $\frown \colon H_\bullet(X) \times H^\bullet(X) \to H_\bullet(X)$, and looking carefully at the above composition shows that it indeed takes the form of maps $\frown \colon H_p(X) \times H^q(X) \to H_{p-q}(X)$, which is always zero for $p < q$.

== Fundamental class ==
For any point $x$ in $M$, we have the long-exact sequence in homology (with coefficients in $R$) of the pair $(M, M - x)$ (See Relative homology)

$$\cdots \to H_n(M - {x}; R) \stackrel{i_*}{\to} H_n(M; R) \stackrel{j_*}{\to} H_n (M, M - {x}; R) \stackrel{\partial}{\to} H_{n-1}(M - {x}; R)  \to \cdots .$$

An element $[M]$ of $H_n(M; R)$ is called the fundamental class for $M$ if $j_*([M])$ is a generator of $H_n (M, M - {x}; R)$. A fundamental class of $M$ exists if $M$ is closed and R-orientable. In fact, if $M$ is a closed, connected and $R$-orientable manifold, the map $H_n(M; R) \stackrel{j_*}{\to} H_n (M, M - {x}; R)$ is an isomorphism for all $x$ in $R$ and hence, we can choose any generator of $H_n(M; R)$ as the fundamental class.

== Relation with Poincaré duality ==
For a closed $R$-orientable n-manifold $M$ with fundamental class $[M]$ in $H_n(M; R)$ (which we can choose to be any generator of $H_n(M; R)$), the cap product map
$$H^k(M; R)\to H_{n-k}(M; R),
\alpha\mapsto [M]\frown \alpha$$
is an isomorphism for all $k$. This result is famously called Poincaré duality.

== The slant product ==
If in the above discussion one replaces $X\times X$ by $X\times Y$, the construction can be (partially) replicated starting from the mappings
$$C_\bullet(X\times Y) \otimes C^\bullet(Y)\cong C_\bullet(X) \otimes C_\bullet(Y) \otimes C^\bullet(Y) \overset{\mathrm{Id} \otimes \varepsilon}{\longrightarrow} C_\bullet(X)$$
and
$$C^\bullet(X\times Y) \otimes C_\bullet(Y)\cong C^\bullet(X) \otimes C^\bullet(Y) \otimes C_\bullet(Y) \overset{\mathrm{Id} \otimes \varepsilon}{\longrightarrow} C^\bullet(X)$$

to get, respectively, slant products $/$:
$$H_p(X\times Y;R) \otimes H^q(Y;R) \rightarrow H_{p-q}(X;R)$$
and
$$H^p(X\times Y;R) \otimes H_q(Y;R) \rightarrow H^{p-q}(X;R).$$

In case $X=Y$, the first one is related to the cap product by the diagonal map: $\Delta_*(a)/\phi = a\frown \phi$.

These ‘products’ are in some ways more like division than multiplication, which is reflected in their notation.

== Equations ==
The boundary of a cap product is given by :

$$\partial(\sigma \frown \psi) = (-1)^q(\partial \sigma \frown \psi - \sigma \frown \delta \psi).$$

Given a map f the induced maps satisfy :

$$f_*( \sigma ) \frown \psi = f_*(\sigma \frown f^* (\psi)).$$

The cap and cup product are related by :

$$\psi(\sigma \frown \varphi) = (\varphi \smile \psi)(\sigma)$$

where

$\sigma : \Delta ^{p+q} \rightarrow X$, $\psi \in C^q(X;R)$ and $\varphi \in C^p(X;R).$

If $\sigma$ is allowed to be of higher degree than $p+q$, the last identity takes a more general form

$$(\sigma \frown \varphi) \frown \psi = \sigma \frown (\varphi \smile \psi)$$

which makes $H_{\ast}(X;R)$ into a right $H^{\ast}(X;R)$-module.

== See also ==
- Cup product
- Poincaré duality
- Singular homology
- Homology theory
