= Bruhat order =

Partial order on a Coxeter group

In mathematics, the Bruhat order (also called the strong order, strong Bruhat order, Chevalley order, Bruhat–Chevalley order, or Chevalley–Bruhat order) is a partial order on the elements of a Coxeter group, that corresponds to the inclusion order on Schubert varieties.

== History ==
The Bruhat order on the Schubert varieties of a flag manifold or a Grassmannian was first studied by Ehresmann (1934), and the analogue for more general semisimple algebraic groups was studied by Claude Chevalley in an unpublished manuscript from 1958, not published until 1994. Verma (1968) started the combinatorial study of the Bruhat order on the Weyl group, and introduced the name "Bruhat order" because of the relation to the Bruhat decomposition introduced by François Bruhat.

The left and right weak Bruhat orderings were studied by Björner (1984).

== Definition ==
If (W, S) is a Coxeter system with generators S, then the Bruhat order is a partial order on the group W. The definition of Bruhat order relies on several other definitions: first, reduced word for an element w of W is a minimum-length expression of w as a product of elements of S, and the length ℓ(w) of w is the length of its reduced words. Then the (strong) Bruhat order is defined by u ≤ v if some substring of some (or every) reduced word for v is a reduced word for u. (Here a substring is not necessarily a consecutive substring.)

There are two other related partial orders:

- the weak left (Bruhat) order is defined by u ≤_{L} v if some final substring of some reduced word for v is a reduced word for u, and
- the weak right (Bruhat) order is defined by u ≤_{R} v if some initial substring of some reduced word for v is a reduced word for u.

For more on the weak orders, see the article Weak order of permutations.

== Bruhat graph ==
The Bruhat graph is a directed graph related to the (strong) Bruhat order. The vertex set is the set of elements of the Coxeter group and the edge set consists of directed edges (u, v) whenever u = tv for some reflection t and ℓ(u) < ℓ(v). One may view the graph as an edge-labeled directed graph with edge labels coming from the set of reflections. (One could also define the Bruhat graph using multiplication on the right; as graphs, the resulting objects are isomorphic, but the edge labelings are different.)

The strong Bruhat order on the symmetric group (permutations) has Möbius function given by $\mu(\pi,\sigma)=(-1)^{\ell(\sigma)-\ell(\pi)}$, and thus this poset is Eulerian, meaning its Möbius function is produced by the rank function on the poset.

== See also ==
- Kazhdan–Lusztig polynomial
