= Reflection group =

Discrete group type in group theory

In group theory and geometry, a reflection group is a discrete group which is generated by a set of reflections of a finite-dimensional Euclidean space. The symmetry group of a regular polytope or of a tiling of the Euclidean space by congruent copies of a regular polytope is necessarily a reflection group. Reflection groups also include Weyl groups and crystallographic Coxeter groups. While the orthogonal group is generated by reflections (by the Cartan–Dieudonné theorem), it is a continuous group (indeed, Lie group), not a discrete group, and is generally considered separately.

== Definition ==
Let E be a finite-dimensional Euclidean space. A finite reflection group is a subgroup of the general linear group of E which is generated by a set of orthogonal reflections across hyperplanes passing through the origin. An affine reflection group is a discrete subgroup of the affine group of E that is generated by a set of affine reflections of E (without the requirement that the reflection hyperplanes pass through the origin).

The corresponding notions can be defined over other fields, leading to complex reflection groups and analogues of reflection groups over a finite field.

== Examples ==
=== Two dimensions ===
In two dimensions, the finite reflection groups are the dihedral groups, which are generated by reflection in two lines that form an angle of $2\pi/n$ and correspond to the Coxeter diagram $I_2(n).$ Conversely, the cyclic point groups in two dimensions are not generated by reflections, nor contain any – they are subgroups of index 2 of a dihedral group.

Infinite reflection groups include the frieze groups $*\infty\infty$ and $*22\infty$ and the wallpaper groups $**$, $*2222$, $*333$, $*442$ and $*632$. If the angle between two lines is an irrational multiple of pi, the group generated by reflections in these lines is infinite and non-discrete, hence, it is not a reflection group.

=== Three dimensions ===
Finite reflection groups are the point groups C_{nv}, D_{nh}, and the symmetry groups of the five Platonic solids. Dual regular polyhedra (cube and octahedron, as well as dodecahedron and icosahedron) give rise to isomorphic symmetry groups. The classification of finite reflection groups of R^{3} is an instance of the ADE classification.

== Relation with Coxeter groups ==
A reflection group W admits a presentation of a special kind discovered and studied by H. S. M. Coxeter. The reflections in the faces of a fixed fundamental "chamber" are generators r_{i} of W of order 2. All relations between them formally follow from the relations

$$(r_i r_j)^{c_{ij}} = 1,$$

expressing the fact that the product of the reflections r_{i} and r_{j} in two hyperplanes H_{i} and H_{j} meeting at an angle $\pi/c_{ij}$ is a rotation by the angle $2\pi/c_{ij}$ fixing the subspace H_{i} ∩ H_{j} of codimension 2. Thus, viewed as an abstract group, every reflection group is a Coxeter group.

== Finite fields ==
When working over finite fields, one defines a "reflection" as a map that fixes a hyperplane. Geometrically, this amounts to including shears in a hyperplane. Reflection groups over finite fields of characteristic not 2 were classified by Zalesskiĭ & Serežkin (1981).

== Generalizations ==
Discrete isometry groups of more general Riemannian manifolds generated by reflections have also been considered. The most important class arises from Riemannian symmetric spaces of rank 1: the n-sphere S^{n}, corresponding to finite reflection groups, the Euclidean space R^{n}, corresponding to affine reflection groups, and the hyperbolic space H^{n}, where the corresponding groups are called hyperbolic reflection groups. In two dimensions, triangle groups include reflection groups of all three kinds.

== See also ==
- Hyperplane arrangement
- Chevalley–Shephard–Todd theorem on invariant functions of a reflection group
- Reflection groups are related to kaleidoscopes.
- Parabolic subgroup of a reflection group
