= Length function =

Function in geometric group theory

In the mathematical field of geometric group theory, a length function is a function that assigns a nonnegative real number to each element of a group in a way that is compatible with the group operation in an appropriate sense. Length functions generalize the notion of word length in a group represented by generators and relations.

== Definition ==
A length function L on a group group G is a function from G to the nonnegative real numbers R^{+} that satisfies the following properties:

$$L(e) = 0$$
where e is the identity element in G,
$$L(g^{-1}) = L(g)$$
for all $g$ in G, and
$$L(g_1 g_2) \leq L(g_1) + L(g_2)$$
for all $g_1, g_2$ in G.

These properties echo the axioms for a metric and a filtered algebra.

== Word metric ==
An important example of a length is the word metric: given a presentation of a group by generators and relations, the length of an element is the length of the shortest word expressing it.

Coxeter groups (including the symmetric group) have combinatorially important length functions, using the simple reflections as generators (thus each simple reflection has length 1). See also: length of a Weyl group element.

A longest element of a Coxeter group is both important and unique up to conjugation (up to different choice of simple reflections).

== Properties ==
A group with a length function does not form a filtered group, meaning that the sublevel sets $S_i := \{g \mid L(g) \leq i\}$ do not form subgroups in general. However, the group algebra of a group with a length functions forms a filtered algebra: the axiom $L(gh) \leq L(g)+L(h)$ corresponds to the filtration axiom.
