= Real form (Lie theory) =

In mathematics, the notion of a real form relates objects defined over the field of real and complex numbers. A real Lie algebra g_{0} is called a real form of a complex Lie algebra g if g is the complexification of g_{0}:

$$\mathfrak{g}\simeq\mathfrak{g}_0\otimes_{\mathbb{R}}\mathbb{C}.$$

The notion of a real form can also be defined for complex Lie groups. Real forms of complex semisimple Lie groups and Lie algebras have been completely classified by Élie Cartan.

== Real forms for Lie groups and algebraic groups ==
Using the Lie correspondence between Lie groups and Lie algebras, the notion of a real form can be defined for Lie groups. In the case of linear algebraic groups, the notions of complexification and real form have a natural description in the language of algebraic geometry.

== Classification ==
Just as complex semisimple Lie algebras are classified by Dynkin diagrams, the real forms of a semisimple Lie algebra are classified by Satake diagrams, which are obtained from the Dynkin diagram of the complex form by labeling some vertices black (filled), and connecting some other vertices in pairs by arrows, according to certain rules.

It is a basic fact in the structure theory of complex semisimple Lie algebras that every such algebra has two special real forms: one is the compact real form and corresponds to a compact Lie group under the Lie correspondence (its Satake diagram has all vertices blackened), and the other is the split real form and corresponds to a Lie group that is as far as possible from being compact (its Satake diagram has no vertices blackened and no arrows). In the case of the complex special linear group SL(n,C), the compact real form is the special unitary group SU(n) and the split real form is the real special linear group SL(n,R). The classification of real forms of semisimple Lie algebras was accomplished by Élie Cartan in the context of Riemannian symmetric spaces. In general, there may be more than two real forms.

Suppose that g_{0} is a semisimple Lie algebra over the field of real numbers. By Cartan's criterion, the Killing form is nondegenerate, and can be diagonalized in a suitable basis with the diagonal entries +1 or −1. By Sylvester's law of inertia, the number of positive entries, or the positive index of inertia, is an invariant of the bilinear form, i.e. it does not depend on the choice of the diagonalizing basis. This is a number between 0 and the dimension of g which is an important invariant of the real Lie algebra, called its index.

=== Split real form ===
A real form g_{0} of a finite-dimensional complex semisimple Lie algebra g is said to be split, or normal, if in each Cartan decomposition g_{0} = k_{0} ⊕ p_{0}, the space p_{0} contains a maximal abelian subalgebra of g_{0}, i.e. its Cartan subalgebra. Élie Cartan proved that every complex semisimple Lie algebra g has a split real form, which is unique up to isomorphism. It has maximal index among all real forms.

The split form corresponds to the Satake diagram with no vertices blackened and no arrows.

=== Compact real form ===
A real Lie algebra g_{0} is called compact if the Killing form is negative definite, i.e. the index of g_{0} is zero. In this case g_{0} = k_{0} is a compact Lie algebra. It is known that under the Lie correspondence, compact Lie algebras correspond to compact Lie groups.

The compact form corresponds to the Satake diagram with all vertices blackened.

== Construction of the compact real form ==
In general, the construction of the compact real form uses structure theory of semisimple Lie algebras. For classical Lie algebras there is a more explicit construction.

Let g_{0} be a real Lie algebra of matrices over R that is closed under the transpose map,

$$X\to {X}^{t}.$$

Then g_{0} decomposes into the direct sum of its skew-symmetric part k_{0} and its symmetric part p_{0}. This is the Cartan decomposition:

$$\mathfrak{g}_0=\mathfrak{k}_0\oplus\mathfrak{p}_0.$$

The complexification g of g_{0} decomposes into the direct sum of g_{0} and ig_{0}. The real vector space of matrices

$$\mathfrak{u}_0=\mathfrak{k}_0\oplus i\mathfrak{p}_0$$

is a subspace of the complex Lie algebra g that is closed under the commutators and consists of skew-hermitian matrices. It follows that u_{0} is a real Lie subalgebra of g, that its Killing form is negative definite (making it a compact Lie algebra), and that the complexification of u_{0} is g. Therefore, u_{0} is a compact form of g.

== See also ==
- Complexification (Lie group)
