= Dynkin =

Dynkin (Russian: Дынкин) is a Russian masculine surname, its feminine counterpart is Dynkina. It may refer to the following notable people:

- Aleksandr Dynkin (born 1948), Russian economist
- Eugene Dynkin (1924–2014), Soviet and American mathematician known for
  - Dynkin diagram
  - Coxeter–Dynkin diagram
  - Dynkin system
  - Dynkin's formula
  - Doob–Dynkin lemma
  - Dynkin index
