= McKay graph =

Construction in graph theory

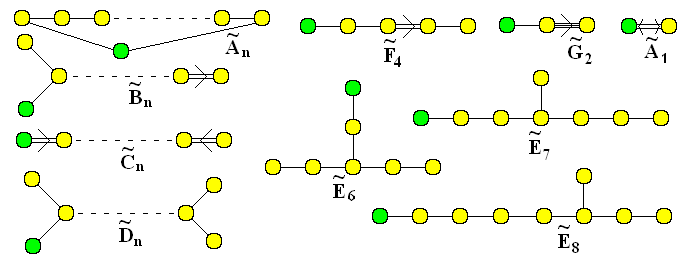
Affine (extended) Dynkin diagrams

In mathematics, the McKay graph of a finite-dimensional representation V of a finite group G is a weighted quiver encoding the structure of the representation theory of G. Each node represents an irreducible representation of G. If χ_{i}, χ_{j} are irreducible representations of G, then there is an arrow from χ_{i} to χ_{j} if and only if χ_{j} is a constituent of the tensor product $V\otimes\chi_i.$ Then the weight n_{ij} of the arrow is the number of times this constituent appears in $V \otimes\chi_i.$ For finite subgroups H of $\text{GL}(2, \C),$ the McKay graph of H is the McKay graph of the defining 2-dimensional representation of H.

If G has n irreducible characters, then the Cartan matrix c_{V} of the representation V of dimension d is defined by $c_V = (d\delta_{ij} -n_{ij})_{ij} ,$ where δ is the Kronecker delta. A result by Robert Steinberg states that if g is a representative of a conjugacy class of G, then the vectors $((\chi_i(g))_i$ are the eigenvectors of c_{V} to the eigenvalues $d-\chi_V(g),$ where χ_{V} is the character of the representation V.

The McKay correspondence, named after John McKay, states that there is a one-to-one correspondence between the McKay graphs of the finite subgroups of $\text{SL}(2, \C)$ and the extended Dynkin diagrams, which appear in the ADE classification of the simple Lie algebras.

== Definition ==
Let G be a finite group, V be a representation of G and χ be its character. Let $\{\chi_1,\ldots,\chi_d\}$ be the irreducible representations of G. If

$$V\otimes\chi_i = \sum\nolimits_j n_{ij} \chi_j,$$

then define the McKay graph Γ_{G} of G, relative to V, as follows:

- Each irreducible representation of G corresponds to a node in Γ_{G}.
- If n_{ij} > 0, there is an arrow from χ_{i} to χ_{j} of weight n_{ij}, written as $\chi_i\xrightarrow{n_{ij}}\chi_j,$ or sometimes as n_{ij} unlabeled arrows.
- If $n_{ij} = n_{ji},$ we denote the two opposite arrows between χ_{i}, χ_{j} as an undirected edge of weight n_{ij}. Moreover, if $n_{ij} = 1,$ we omit the weight label.

We can calculate the value of n_{ij} using inner product $\langle \cdot, \cdot \rangle$ on characters:

$$n_{ij} = \langle V\otimes\chi_i, \chi_j\rangle = \frac{1}{|G|}\sum_{g\in G} V(g)\chi_i(g)\overline{\chi_j(g)}.$$

The McKay graph of a finite subgroup of $\text{GL}(2, \C)$ is defined to be the McKay graph of its canonical representation.

For finite subgroups of $\text{SL}(2, \C),$ the canonical representation on $\C^2$ is self-dual, so $n_{ij}=n_{ji}$ for all i, j. Thus, the McKay graph of finite subgroups of $\text{SL}(2, \C)$ is undirected.

In fact, by the McKay correspondence, there is a one-to-one correspondence between the finite subgroups of $\text{SL}(2, \C)$ and the extended Coxeter-Dynkin diagrams of type A-D-E.

We define the Cartan matrix c_{V} of V as follows:

$$c_V = (d\delta_{ij} - n_{ij})_{ij},$$

where δ_{ij} is the Kronecker delta.

== Some results ==
- If the representation V is faithful, then every irreducible representation is contained in some tensor power $V^{\otimes k},$ and the McKay graph of V is connected.
- The McKay graph of a finite subgroup of $\text{SL}(2, \C)$ has no self-loops, that is, $n_{ii}=0$ for all i.
- The arrows of the McKay graph of a finite subgroup of $\text{SL}(2, \C)$ are all of weight one.

== Examples ==
- Suppose G = A × B, and there are canonical irreducible representations c_{A}, c_{B} of A, B respectively. If χ_{i}, i = 1, …, k, are the irreducible representations of A and ψ_{j}, j = 1, …, ℓ, are the irreducible representations of B, then

$$\chi_i\times\psi_j\quad 1\leq i \leq k,\,\, 1\leq j \leq \ell$$

are the irreducible representations of A × B, where $\chi_i\times\psi_j(a,b) = \chi_i(a)\psi_j(b), (a,b)\in A\times B.$ In this case, we have

$$\langle (c_A\times c_B)\otimes (\chi_i\times\psi_\ell), \chi_n\times\psi_p\rangle = \langle c_A\otimes \chi_k, \chi_n\rangle\cdot \langle c_B\otimes \psi_\ell, \psi_p\rangle.$$

Therefore, there is an arrow in the McKay graph of G between $\chi_i\times\psi_j$ and $\chi_k\times\psi_\ell$ if and only if there is an arrow in the McKay graph of A between χ_{i}, χ_{k} and there is an arrow in the McKay graph of B between ψ_{j}, ψ_{ℓ}. In this case, the weight on the arrow in the McKay graph of G is the product of the weights of the two corresponding arrows in the McKay graphs of A and B.

- Felix Klein proved that the finite subgroups of $\text{SL}(2, \C)$ are the binary polyhedral groups; all are conjugate to subgroups of $\text{SU}(2, \C).$ The McKay correspondence states that there is a one-to-one correspondence between the McKay graphs of these binary polyhedral groups and the extended Dynkin diagrams. For example, the binary tetrahedral group $\overline{T}$ is generated by the $\text{SU}(2, \C)$ matrices:

$$S = \left( \begin{array}{cc}
i & 0 \\
0 & -i \end{array} \right),\ \
V = \left( \begin{array}{cc}
0 & i \\
i & 0 \end{array} \right),\ \
U = \frac{1}{\sqrt{2}} \left( \begin{array}{cc}
\varepsilon & \varepsilon^3 \\
\varepsilon & \varepsilon^7 \end{array} \right),$$

where ε is a primitive eighth root of unity. In fact, we have

$$\overline{T} = \{U^k, SU^k,VU^k,SVU^k \mid k = 0,\ldots, 5\}.$$

The conjugacy classes of $\overline{T}$ are:

$$C_1 = \{U^0 = I\},$$
$$C_2 = \{U^3 = - I\},$$
$$C_3 = \{\pm S, \pm V, \pm SV\},$$
$$C_4 = \{U^2, SU^2, VU^2, SVU^2\},$$
$$C_5 = \{-U, SU, VU, SVU\},$$
$$C_6 = \{-U^2, -SU^2, -VU^2, -SVU^2\},$$
$$C_7 = \{U, -SU, -VU, -SVU\}.$$

The character table of $\overline{T}$ is

Conjugacy Classes	$C_1$	$C_2$	$C_3$	$C_4$	$C_5$	$C_6$	$C_7$
$\chi_1$	$1$	$1$	$1$	$1$	$1$	$1$	$1$
$\chi_2$	$1$	$1$	$1$	$\omega$	$\omega^2$	$\omega$	$\omega^2$
$\chi_3$	$1$	$1$	$1$	$\omega^2$	$\omega$	$\omega^2$	$\omega$
$\chi_4$	$3$	$3$	$-1$	$0$	$0$	$0$	$0$
$c$	$2$	$-2$	$0$	$-1$	$-1$	$1$	$1$
$\chi_5$	$2$	$-2$	$0$	$-\omega$	$-\omega^2$	$\omega$	$\omega^2$
$\chi_6$	$2$	$-2$	$0$	$-\omega^2$	$-\omega$	$\omega^2$	$\omega$

Here $\omega = e^{2\pi i/3}.$ The canonical representation V is here denoted by c. Using the inner product, we find that the McKay graph of $\overline{T}$ is the extended Coxeter–Dynkin diagram of type $\tilde{E}_6.$

== See also ==
- ADE classification
- Binary tetrahedral group
