= Compact Lie algebra =

Mathematical theory

In the mathematical field of Lie theory, there are two definitions of a compact Lie algebra. Extrinsically and topologically, a compact Lie algebra is the Lie algebra of a compact Lie group; this definition includes tori. Intrinsically and algebraically, a compact Lie algebra is a real Lie algebra whose Killing form is negative definite; this definition is more restrictive and excludes tori. A compact Lie algebra can be seen as the smallest real form of a corresponding complex Lie algebra, namely the complexification.

== Definition ==
Formally, one may define a compact Lie algebra either as the Lie algebra of a compact Lie group, or as a real Lie algebra whose Killing form is negative definite. These definitions do not quite agree:

- The Killing form on the Lie algebra of a compact Lie group is negative semidefinite, not negative definite in general.
- If the Killing form of a Lie algebra is negative definite, then the Lie algebra is the Lie algebra of a compact semisimple Lie group.

In general, the Lie algebra of a compact Lie group decomposes as the Lie algebra direct sum of a commutative summand (for which the corresponding subgroup is a torus) and a summand on which the Killing form is negative definite.

The converse of the first result above is false: Even if the Killing form of a Lie algebra is negative semidefinite, this does not mean that the Lie algebra is the Lie algebra of some compact group. For example, the Killing form on the Lie algebra of the Heisenberg group is identically zero, hence negative semidefinite, but this Lie algebra is not the Lie algebra of any compact group.

== Properties ==
- Compact Lie algebras are reductive; note that the analogous result is true for compact groups in general.
- The Lie algebra $\mathfrak{g}$ for the compact Lie group G admits an Ad(G)-invariant inner product,. Conversely, if $\mathfrak{g}$ admits an Ad-invariant inner product, then $\mathfrak{g}$ is the Lie algebra of some compact group. If $\mathfrak{g}$ is semisimple, this inner product can be taken to be the negative of the Killing form. Thus relative to this inner product, Ad(G) acts by orthogonal transformations ($\operatorname{SO}(\mathfrak{g})$) and $\operatorname{ad}\ \mathfrak{g}$ acts by skew-symmetric matrices ($\mathfrak{so}(\mathfrak{g})$). It is possible to develop the theory of complex semisimple Lie algebras by viewing them as the complexifications of Lie algebras of compact groups; the existence of an Ad-invariant inner product on the compact real form greatly simplifies the development.
  This can be seen as a compact analog of Ado's theorem on the representability of Lie algebras: just as every finite-dimensional Lie algebra in characteristic 0 embeds in $\mathfrak{gl},$ every compact Lie algebra embeds in $\mathfrak{so}.$
- The Satake diagram of a compact Lie algebra is the Dynkin diagram of the complex Lie algebra with all vertices blackened.
- Compact Lie algebras are opposite to split real Lie algebras among real forms, split Lie algebras being "as far as possible" from being compact.

== Classification ==
The compact Lie algebras are classified and named according to the compact real forms of the complex semisimple Lie algebras. These are:

- $A_n:$ $\mathfrak{su}_{n+1},$ corresponding to the special unitary group (properly, the compact form is PSU, the projective special unitary group);
- $B_n:$ $\mathfrak{so}_{2n+1},$ corresponding to the special orthogonal group (or $\mathfrak{o}_{2n+1},$ corresponding to the orthogonal group);
- $C_n:$ $\mathfrak{sp}_n,$ corresponding to the compact symplectic group; sometimes written $\mathfrak{usp}_n,$;
- $D_n:$ $\mathfrak{so}_{2n},$ corresponding to the special orthogonal group (or $\mathfrak{o}_{2n},$ corresponding to the orthogonal group) (properly, the compact form is PSO, the projective special orthogonal group);
- Compact real forms of the exceptional Lie algebras $E_6, E_7, E_8, F_4, G_2.$

=== Isomorphisms ===
The exceptional isomorphisms of connected Dynkin diagrams yield exceptional isomorphisms of compact Lie algebras and corresponding Lie groups.

The classification is non-redundant if one takes $n \geq 1$ for $A_n,$ $n \geq 2$ for $B_n,$ $n \geq 3$ for $C_n,$ and $n \geq 4$ for $D_n.$ If one instead takes $n \geq 0$ or $n \geq 1$ one obtains certain exceptional isomorphisms.

For $n=0,$ $A_0 \cong B_0 \cong C_0 \cong D_0$ is the trivial diagram, corresponding to the trivial group $\operatorname{SU}(1) \cong \operatorname{SO}(1) \cong \operatorname{Sp}(0) \cong \operatorname{SO}(0).$

For $n=1,$ the isomorphism $\mathfrak{su}_2 \cong \mathfrak{so}_3 \cong \mathfrak{sp}_1$ corresponds to the isomorphisms of diagrams $A_1 \cong B_1 \cong C_1$ and the corresponding isomorphisms of Lie groups $\operatorname{SU}(2) \cong \operatorname{Spin}(3) \cong \operatorname{Sp}(1)$ (the 3-sphere or unit quaternions).

For $n=2,$ the isomorphism $\mathfrak{so}_5 \cong \mathfrak{sp}_2$ corresponds to the isomorphisms of diagrams $B_2 \cong C_2,$ and the corresponding isomorphism of Lie groups $\operatorname{Sp}(2) \cong \operatorname{Spin}(5).$

For $n=3,$ the isomorphism $\mathfrak{su}_4 \cong \mathfrak{so}_6$ corresponds to the isomorphisms of diagrams $A_3 \cong D_3,$ and the corresponding isomorphism of Lie groups $\operatorname{SU}(4) \cong \operatorname{Spin}(6).$

If one considers $E_4$ and $E_5$ as diagrams, these are isomorphic to $A_4$ and $D_5,$ respectively, with corresponding isomorphisms of Lie algebras.

== See also ==
- Real form
- Split Lie algebra
