= Vogan =

Vogan may refer to:

== People ==
- David Vogan (born 1954), American mathematician
- Don Vogan (1929–2009), Canadian ice hockey player
- Emmett Vogan (1893–1969), American actor

== Other uses ==
- Vogan, Togo, a town
- Vogan diagram, a diagram that indicates the maximal compact subgroup

== See also ==
- Vågan
