= Exceptional Lie algebra =

Complex simple Lie Algebra

In mathematics, an exceptional Lie algebra is a complex simple Lie algebra whose Dynkin diagram is of exceptional (nonclassical) type. There are exactly five of them: $\mathfrak{g}_2, \mathfrak{f}_4, \mathfrak{e}_6, \mathfrak{e}_7, \mathfrak{e}_8$; their respective dimensions are 14, 52, 78, 133, 248. The corresponding diagrams are:

- G_{2}:
- F_{4}:
- E_{6}:
- E_{7}:
- E_{8}:

In contrast, simple Lie algebras that are not exceptional are called classical Lie algebras (there are infinitely many of them).

== Construction ==
There is no simple universally accepted way to construct exceptional Lie algebras; in fact, they were discovered only in the process of the classification program. Here are some constructions:

- § 22.1-2 from Fulton and Harris' book give a detailed construction of $\mathfrak{g}_2$.
- Exceptional Lie algebras may be realized as the derivation algebras of appropriate nonassociative algebras.
- Construct $\mathfrak{e}_8$ first and then find $\mathfrak{e}_6, \mathfrak{e}_7$ as subalgebras.
- Tits has given a uniformed construction of the five exceptional Lie algebras.
