= ADE classification =

Mathematical classification

The simply laced Dynkin diagrams classify diverse mathematical objects.

In mathematics, the ADE classification (originally A-D-E classifications) is a situation where certain kinds of objects are in correspondence with simply laced Dynkin diagrams. The question of giving a common origin to these classifications, rather than a posteriori verification of a parallelism, was posed in (Arnold 1976). The complete list of simply laced Dynkin diagrams comprises

$$A_n, \, D_n, \, E_6, \, E_7, \, E_8.$$

Here "simply laced" means that there are no multiple edges, which corresponds to all simple roots in the root system forming angles of $\pi/2 = 90^\circ$ (no edge between the vertices) or $2\pi/3 = 120^\circ$ (single edge between the vertices). These are two of the four families of Dynkin diagrams (omitting $B_n$ and $C_n$), and three of the five exceptional Dynkin diagrams (omitting $F_4$ and $G_2$).

This list is non-redundant if one takes $n \geq 4$ for $D_n.$ If one extends the families to include redundant terms, one obtains the exceptional isomorphisms

$$D_3 \cong A_3, E_4 \cong A_4, E_5 \cong D_5,$$

and corresponding isomorphisms of classified objects.

The A, D, E nomenclature also yields the simply laced finite Coxeter groups, by the same diagrams: in this case the Dynkin diagrams exactly coincide with the Coxeter diagrams, as there are no multiple edges.

== Lie algebras ==
In terms of complex semisimple Lie algebras:

- $A_n$ corresponds to $\mathfrak{sl}_{n+1}(\mathbf{C}),$ the special linear Lie algebra of traceless operators,
- $D_n$ corresponds to $\mathfrak{so}_{2n}(\mathbf{C}),$ the even special orthogonal Lie algebra of even-dimensional skew-symmetric operators, and
- $E_6, E_7, E_8$ are three of the five exceptional Lie algebras.

In terms of compact Lie algebras and corresponding simply laced Lie groups:

- $A_n$ corresponds to $\mathfrak{su}_{n+1},$ the algebra of the special unitary group $SU(n+1);$
- $D_n$ corresponds to $\mathfrak{so}_{2n}(\mathbf{R}),$ the algebra of the even projective special orthogonal group $PSO(2n)$, while
- $E_6, E_7, E_8$ are three of five exceptional compact Lie algebras.

== Binary polyhedral groups ==
The same classification applies to discrete subgroups of $SU(2)$, the binary polyhedral groups; properly, binary polyhedral groups correspond to the simply laced affine Dynkin diagrams $\tilde A_n, \tilde D_n, \tilde E_k,$ and the representations of these groups can be understood in terms of these diagrams. This connection is known as the McKay correspondence after John McKay. The connection to Platonic solids is described in (Dickson 2004). The correspondence uses the construction of McKay graph.

Note that the ADE correspondence is not the correspondence of Platonic solids to their reflection group of symmetries: for instance, in the ADE correspondence the tetrahedron, cube/octahedron, and dodecahedron/icosahedron correspond to $E_6, E_7, E_8,$ while the reflection groups of the tetrahedron, cube/octahedron, and dodecahedron/icosahedron are instead representations of the Coxeter groups $A_3, BC_3,$ and $H_3.$

The orbifold of $\mathbf{C}^2$ constructed using each discrete subgroup leads to an ADE-type singularity at the origin, termed a du Val singularity.

The McKay correspondence can be extended to multiply laced Dynkin diagrams, by using a pair of binary polyhedral groups. This is known as the Slodowy correspondence, named after Peter Slodowy – see (Stekolshchik 2008).

== Labeled graphs ==
The ADE graphs and the extended (affine) ADE graphs can also be characterized in terms of labellings with certain properties, which can be stated in terms of the discrete Laplace operators or Cartan matrices. Proofs in terms of Cartan matrices may be found in (Kac 1990, pp. 47–54).

The affine ADE graphs are the only graphs that admit a positive labeling (labeling of the nodes by positive real numbers) with the following property:

Twice any label is the sum of the labels on adjacent vertices.

That is, they are the only positive functions with eigenvalue 1 for the discrete Laplacian (sum of adjacent vertices minus value of vertex) – the positive solutions to the homogeneous equation:

$$\Delta \phi = \phi.\$$

Equivalently, the positive functions in the kernel of $\Delta - I.$ The resulting numbering is unique up to scale, and if normalized such that the smallest number is 1, consists of small integers – 1 through 6, depending on the graph.

The ordinary ADE graphs are the only graphs that admit a positive labeling with the following property:

Twice any label minus two is the sum of the labels on adjacent vertices.

In terms of the Laplacian, the positive solutions to the inhomogeneous equation:

$$\Delta \phi = \phi - 2.\$$

The resulting numbering is unique (scale is specified by the "2") and consists of integers; for E_{8} they range from 58 to 270, and have been observed as early as (Bourbaki 1968).

== Other classifications ==
The elementary catastrophes are also classified by the ADE classification.

The ADE diagrams are exactly the quivers of finite type, via Gabriel's theorem.

There is also a link with generalized quadrangles, as the three non-degenerate GQs with three points on each line correspond to the three exceptional root systems E_{6}, E_{7} and E_{8}. The classes A and D correspond degenerate cases where the line set is empty or we have all lines passing through a fixed point, respectively.

It was suggested that symmetries of small droplet clusters may be subject to an ADE classification.

The minimal models of two-dimensional conformal field theory have an ADE classification.

Four dimensional $\mathcal{N}=2$ superconformal gauge quiver theories with unitary gauge groups have an ADE classification.

== Extension of the classification ==
Arnold has subsequently proposed many further extensions in this classification scheme, in the idea to revisit and generalize the Coxeter classification and Dynkin classification under the single umbrella of root systems. He tried to introduce informal concepts of Complexification and Symplectization based on analogies between Picard–Lefschetz theory which he interprets as the Complexified version of Morse theory and then extend them to other areas of mathematics. He tries also to identify hierarchies and dictionaries between mathematical objects and theories where for example diffeomorphism corresponds to the A type of the Dynkin classification, volume preserving diffeomorphism corresponds to B type and Symplectomorphisms corresponds to C type. In the same spirit he revisits analogies between different mathematical objects where for example the Lie bracket in the scope of Diffeomorphisms becomes analogous (and at the same time includes as a special case) the Poisson bracket of Symplectomorphism.

=== Trinities ===
Arnold extended this further under the rubric of "mathematical trinities". McKay has extended his correspondence along parallel and sometimes overlapping lines. Arnold terms these "trinities" to evoke religion, and suggest that (currently) these parallels rely more on faith than on rigorous proof, though some parallels are elaborated. Further trinities have been suggested by other authors. Arnold's trinities begin with R/C/H (the real numbers, complex numbers, and quaternions), which he remarks "everyone knows", and proceeds to imagine the other trinities as "complexifications" and "quaternionifications" of classical (real) mathematics, by analogy with finding symplectic analogs of classic Riemannian geometry, which he had previously proposed in the 1970s. In addition to examples from differential topology (such as characteristic classes), Arnold considers the three Platonic symmetries (tetrahedral, octahedral, icosahedral) as corresponding to the reals, complexes, and quaternions, which then connects with McKay's more algebraic correspondences, below.

McKay's correspondences are easier to describe. Firstly, the extended Dynkin diagrams $\tilde E_6, \tilde E_7, \tilde E_8$ (corresponding to tetrahedral, octahedral, and icosahedral symmetry) have symmetry groups $S_3, S_2, S_1,$ respectively, and the associated foldings are the diagrams $\tilde G_2, \tilde F_4, \tilde E_8$ (note that in less careful writing, the extended (tilde) qualifier is often omitted). More significantly, McKay suggests a correspondence between the nodes of the $\tilde E_8$ diagram and certain conjugacy classes of the monster group, which is known as McKay's E_{8} observation; see also monstrous moonshine. McKay further relates the nodes of $\tilde E_7$ to conjugacy classes in 2.B (an order 2 extension of the baby monster group), and the nodes of $\tilde E_6$ to conjugacy classes in 3.Fi_{24}' (an order 3 extension of the Fischer group) – note that these are the three largest sporadic groups, and that the order of the extension corresponds to the symmetries of the diagram.

Turning from large simple groups to small ones, the corresponding Platonic groups $A_4, S_4, A_5$ have connections with the projective special linear groups PSL(2,5), PSL(2,7), and PSL(2,11) (orders 60, 168, and 660), which is deemed a "McKay correspondence". These groups are the only (simple) values for p such that PSL(2,p) acts non-trivially on p points, a fact dating back to Évariste Galois in the 1830s. In fact, the groups decompose as products of sets (not as products of groups) as: $A_4 \times Z_5,$ $S_4 \times Z_7,$ and $A_5 \times Z_{11}.$ These groups also are related to various geometries, which dates to Felix Klein in the 1870s; see icosahedral symmetry: related geometries for historical discussion and (Kostant 1995) for more recent exposition. Associated geometries (tilings on Riemann surfaces) in which the action on p points can be seen are as follows: PSL(2,5) is the symmetries of the icosahedron (genus 0) with the compound of five tetrahedra as a 5-element set, PSL(2,7) of the Klein quartic (genus 3) with an embedded (complementary) Fano plane as a 7-element set (order 2 biplane), and PSL(2,11) the buckminsterfullerene surface (genus 70) with embedded Paley biplane as an 11-element set (order 3 biplane). Of these, the icosahedron dates to antiquity, the Klein quartic to Klein in the 1870s, and the buckyball surface to Pablo Martin and David Singerman in 2008.

Algebro-geometrically, McKay also associates E_{6}, E_{7}, E_{8} respectively with: the 27 lines on a cubic surface, the 28 bitangents of a plane quartic curve, and the 120 tritangent planes of a canonic sextic curve of genus 4. The first of these is well-known, while the second is connected as follows: projecting the cubic from any point not on a line yields a double cover of the plane, branched along a quartic curve, with the 27 lines mapping to 27 of the 28 bitangents, and the 28th line is the image of the exceptional curve of the blowup. Note that the fundamental representations of E_{6}, E_{7}, E_{8} have dimensions 27, 56 (28·2), and 248 (120+128), while the number of roots is 27+45 = 72, 56+70 = 126, and 112+128 = 240. This should also fit into the scheme of relating E_{8,7,6} with the largest three of the sporadic simple groups, Monster, Baby and Fischer 24', cf. monstrous moonshine.

== See also ==
- Elliptic surface
- Catastrophe theory § Arnold's notation, an ADE classification

== Sources ==
- Bourbaki, Nicolas (1968), "Chapters 4–6", Groupes et algebres de Lie, Paris: Hermann
- Arnold, Vladimir (1976), "Problems in present day mathematics", in Felix E. Browder (ed.), Mathematical developments arising from Hilbert problems, Proceedings of symposia in pure mathematics, vol. 28, American Mathematical Society, p. 46 Problem VIII. The A-D-E classifications (V. Arnold).
- Dickson, Leonard E. (2004) [1959], "XIII: Groups of the Regular Solids; Quintic Equations", Algebraic Theories, Mineola, N.Y.: Dover Publications, ISBN 978-0-486-15520-3
- Hazewinkel, Michiel; Hesseling; Siersma, JD.; Veldkamp, F. (1977), "The ubiquity of Coxeter Dynkin diagrams. (An introduction of the A-D-E problem)" (PDF), Nieuw Archief V. Wiskunde, 35 (3): 257–307
- McKay, John (1980), "Graphs, singularities and finite groups", Proc. Symp. Pure Math., Proceedings of Symposia in Pure Mathematics, vol. 37, Amer. Math. Soc., pp. 183– and 265–, doi:10.1090/pspum/037/604577, ISBN 978-0-8218-1440-6
- McKay, John (1982), "Representations and Coxeter Graphs", "The Geometric Vein", Coxeter Festschrift, Berlin: Springer-Verlag, pp. 549–
- Kac, Victor G. (1990), Infinite-Dimensional Lie Algebras (3rd ed.), Cambridge: Cambridge University Press, ISBN 0-521-46693-8
- McKay, John (January 1, 2001), A Rapid Introduction to ADE Theory
- Proctor, R. A. (December 1993), "Two Amusing Dynkin Diagram Graph Classifications", The American Mathematical Monthly, 100 (10): 937–941, doi:10.2307/2324217, ISSN 0002-9890, JSTOR 2324217
- McKay, J.; Sebbar, Abdellah (2007). "Replicable Functions: An introduction". Frontiers in Number Theory, Physics, and Geometry, II. Springer. pp. 373–386. doi:10.1007/978-3-540-30308-4_10. ISBN 978-3-540-30307-7.
- Stekolshchik, R. (2008), Notes on Coxeter Transformations and the McKay Correspondence, Springer Monographs in Mathematics, doi:10.1007/978-3-540-77398-3 (inactive 1 July 2025), ISBN 978-3-540-77398-6
- van Hoboken, Joris (2002), Platonic solids, binary polyhedral groups, Kleinian singularities and Lie algebras of type A,D,E (PDF), Master's Thesis, University of Amsterdam, archived from the original (PDF) on 2012-04-26
