= E7½ =

Subalgebra of E8 containing E7

In mathematics, the Lie algebra E_{7½} is a subalgebra of E_{8} containing E_{7} defined by Landsberg and Manivel in order to fill the "hole" in a dimension formula for the exceptional series E_{n} of simple Lie algebras. This hole was observed by Cvitanovic, Deligne, Cohen and de Man. E_{7½} has dimension 190, and is not simple: as a representation of its subalgebra E_{7}, it splits as E_{7} ⊕ (56) ⊕ R, where (56) is the 56-dimensional irreducible representation of E_{7}. This representation has an invariant symplectic form, and this symplectic form equips (56) ⊕ R with the structure of a Heisenberg algebra; this Heisenberg algebra is the nilradical in E_{7½}.

== See also ==
- Vogel plane
