= Complex Lie algebra =

In mathematics, a complex Lie algebra is a Lie algebra over the complex numbers.

Given a complex Lie algebra $\mathfrak{g}$, its conjugate $\overline{\mathfrak g}$ is a complex Lie algebra with the same underlying real vector space but with $i = \sqrt{-1}$ acting as $-i$ instead.

== Real form ==
Given a complex Lie algebra $\mathfrak{g}$, a real Lie algebra $\mathfrak{g}_0$ is said to be a real form of $\mathfrak{g}$ if the complexification $\mathfrak{g}_0 \otimes_{\mathbb{R}}\mathbb{C}$ is isomorphic to $\mathfrak{g}$.

A real form $\mathfrak{g}_0$ is abelian (resp. nilpotent, solvable, semisimple) if and only if $\mathfrak{g}$ is abelian (resp. nilpotent, solvable, semisimple). On the other hand, a real form $\mathfrak{g}_0$ is simple if and only if either $\mathfrak{g}$ is simple or $\mathfrak{g}$ is of the form $\mathfrak{s} \times \overline{\mathfrak{s}}$ where $\mathfrak{s}, \overline{\mathfrak{s}}$ are simple and are the conjugates of each other.

The existence of a real form in a complex Lie algebra $\mathfrak g$ implies that $\mathfrak g$ is isomorphic to its conjugate; indeed, if $\mathfrak{g} = \mathfrak{g}_0 \otimes_{\mathbb{R}} \mathbb{C} = \mathfrak{g}_0 \oplus i\mathfrak{g}_0$, then let $\tau : \mathfrak{g} \to \overline{\mathfrak{g}}$ denote the $\mathbb{R}$-linear isomorphism induced by complex conjugate and then

$$\tau(i(x + iy)) = \tau(ix - y) = -ix- y = -i\tau(x + iy)$$,

which is to say $\tau$ is in fact a $\mathbb{C}$-linear isomorphism. On the other hand, a Lie algebra can be isomorphic to its conjugate but admit no real form; see and references therein.

== Complex Lie algebra of a complex Lie group ==
Let $\mathfrak{g}$ be a semisimple complex Lie algebra that is the Lie algebra of a complex Lie group $G$. Let $\mathfrak{h}$ be a Cartan subalgebra of $\mathfrak{g}$ and $H$ the Lie subgroup corresponding to $\mathfrak{h}$; the conjugates of $H$ are called Cartan subgroups.

Suppose there is the decomposition $\mathfrak{g} = \mathfrak{n}^- \oplus \mathfrak{h} \oplus \mathfrak{n}^+$ given by a choice of positive roots. Then the exponential map defines an isomorphism from $\mathfrak{n}^+$ to a closed subgroup $U \subset G$. The Lie subgroup $B \subset G$ corresponding to the Borel subalgebra $\mathfrak{b} = \mathfrak{h} \oplus \mathfrak{n}^+$ is closed and is the semidirect product of $H$ and $U$; the conjugates of $B$ are called Borel subgroups.
