= John McKay (mathematician) =

British-Canadian academic (1939–2022)

John K. S. McKay (/məˈkaɪ/ mə-KYE; 18 November 1939 – 19 April 2022) was a British-Canadian mathematician and academic who worked at Concordia University, known for his discovery of monstrous moonshine, his joint construction of some sporadic simple groups, for the McKay conjecture in representation theory, and for the McKay correspondence relating certain finite groups to Lie groups.

== Biography ==
McKay was educated at Dulwich College, earned his Bachelor and Diploma in 1961 and 1962 at the University of Manchester, and his PhD in 1971 from the University of Edinburgh. Since 1974 he worked at Concordia University, since 1979 as a professor in computer science.

He was elected a fellow of the Royal Society of Canada in 2000, and won the 2003 CRM-Fields-PIMS prize.

In April 2007 a Joint Conference was organised by the Université de Montréal and Concordia University honouring four decades of McKay's work.

== See also ==
- ADE classification
- Centre de Recherches Mathématiques
