= Vogel plane =

In mathematics, the Vogel plane is a method of parameterizing simple Lie algebras by eigenvalues α, β, γ of the Casimir operator on the symmetric square of the Lie algebra, which gives a point (α: β: γ) of P^{2}/S_{3}, the projective plane P^{2} divided out by the symmetric group S_{3} of permutations of coordinates. It was introduced by Vogel (1999), and is related by some observations made by Deligne (1996). Landsberg & Manivel (2006) generalized Vogel's work to higher symmetric powers.

The point of the projective plane (modulo permutations) corresponding to a simple complex Lie algebra is given by three eigenvalues α, β, γ of the Casimir operator acting on spaces A, B, C, where the symmetric square of the Lie algebra (usually) decomposes as a sum of the complex numbers and 3 irreducible spaces A, B, C.

== See also ==
- E7½
