= Iwasawa decomposition =

Mathematical process dealing with Lie groups

In mathematics, the Iwasawa decomposition (aka KAN from its expression) of a semisimple Lie group generalises the way a square real matrix can be written as a product of an orthogonal matrix and an upper triangular matrix (QR decomposition, a consequence of Gram–Schmidt orthogonalization). It is named after Kenkichi Iwasawa, the Japanese mathematician who developed this method.

== Definition ==
- G is a connected semisimple real Lie group.
- $\mathfrak{g}_0$ is the Lie algebra of G
- $\mathfrak{g}$ is the complexification of $\mathfrak{g}_0$.
- θ is a Cartan involution of $\mathfrak{g}_0$
- $\mathfrak{g}_0 = \mathfrak{k}_0 \oplus \mathfrak{p}_0$ is the corresponding Cartan decomposition
- $\mathfrak{a}_0$ is a maximal abelian subalgebra of $\mathfrak{p}_0$
- Σ is the set of restricted roots of $\mathfrak{a}_0$, corresponding to eigenvalues of $\mathfrak{a}_0$ acting on $\mathfrak{g}_0$.
- Σ^{+} is a choice of positive roots of Σ
- $\mathfrak{n}_0$ is a nilpotent Lie algebra given as the sum of the root spaces of Σ^{+}
- K, A, N, are the Lie subgroups of G generated by $\mathfrak{k}_0, \mathfrak{a}_0$ and $\mathfrak{n}_0$.

Then the Iwasawa decomposition of $\mathfrak{g}_0$ is

$$\mathfrak{g}_0 = \mathfrak{k}_0 \oplus \mathfrak{a}_0 \oplus \mathfrak{n}_0$$

and the Iwasawa decomposition of G is

$$G=KAN$$

meaning there is an analytic diffeomorphism (but not a group homomorphism) from the manifold $K \times A \times N$ to the Lie group $G$, sending $(k,a,n) \mapsto kan$.

The dimension of A (or equivalently of $\mathfrak{a}_0$) is equal to the real rank of G.

Iwasawa decompositions also hold for some disconnected semisimple groups G, where K becomes a (disconnected) maximal compact subgroup provided the center of G is finite.

The restricted root space decomposition is

$$\mathfrak{g}_0 = \mathfrak{m}_0\oplus\mathfrak{a}_0\oplus_{\lambda\in\Sigma}\mathfrak{g}_{\lambda}$$

where $\mathfrak{m}_0$ is the centralizer of $\mathfrak{a}_0$ in $\mathfrak{k}_0$ and $\mathfrak{g}_{\lambda} = \{X\in\mathfrak{g}_0: [H,X]=\lambda(H)X\;\;\forall H\in\mathfrak{a}_0 \}$ is the root space. The number $m_{\lambda}= \text{dim}\,\mathfrak{g}_{\lambda}$ is called the multiplicity of $\lambda$.

== Examples ==
If G=SL_{n}(R), then we can take K to be the orthogonal matrices, A to be the positive diagonal matrices with determinant 1, and N to be the unipotent group consisting of upper triangular matrices with 1s on the diagonal.

For the case of n = 2, the Iwasawa decomposition of G = SL(2, R) is in terms of

$$\mathbf{K} = \left\{
\begin{pmatrix}
\cos \theta & -\sin \theta \\
\sin \theta & \cos \theta
\end{pmatrix} \in SL(2,\mathbb{R}) \ | \  \theta\in\mathbf{R}  \right\} \cong SO(2) ,$$
$$\mathbf{A} = \left\{
\begin{pmatrix}
r & 0 \\
0 & r^{-1}
\end{pmatrix} \in SL(2,\mathbb{R}) \ | \  r > 0  \right\},$$
$$\mathbf{N} = \left\{
\begin{pmatrix}
1 & x \\
0 & 1
\end{pmatrix} \in SL(2,\mathbb{R}) \ | \  x\in\mathbf{R} \right\}.$$

For the symplectic group G = Sp(2n, R), a possible Iwasawa decomposition is in terms of

$$\mathbf{K} = Sp(2n,\mathbb{R})\cap SO(2n)
= \left\{
\begin{pmatrix}
A & B \\
-B & A
\end{pmatrix} \in Sp(2n,\mathbb{R}) \ | \  A+iB \in U(n) \right\} \cong U(n) ,$$
$$\mathbf{A} = \left\{
\begin{pmatrix}
D & 0 \\
0 & D^{-1}
\end{pmatrix} \in Sp(2n,\mathbb{R}) \ | \  D \text{ positive, diagonal} \right\},$$
$$\mathbf{N} = \left\{
\begin{pmatrix}
N & M \\
0 & N^{-T}
\end{pmatrix} \in Sp(2n,\mathbb{R}) \ | \  N \text{ upper triangular with diagonal elements = 1},\ NM^T = MN^T \right\}.$$

Obtaining the matrices appearing in the decomposition above can be reduced to the calculation of matrix square roots, matrix inverses and performing a QR decomposition.

== Non-Archimedean Iwasawa decomposition ==
There is an analog to the above Iwasawa decomposition for a non-Archimedean field $F$: In this case, the group $GL_n(F)$ can be written as a product of the subgroup of upper-triangular matrices and the (maximal compact) subgroup $GL_n(O_F)$, where $O_F$ is the ring of integers of $F$.

== See also ==
- Lie group decompositions
- Root system of a semi-simple Lie algebra
