= Restricted root system =

Root system associated to a symmetric space

In mathematics, restricted root systems, sometimes called relative root systems, are the root systems associated with a symmetric space. The associated finite reflection group is called the restricted Weyl group. The restricted root system of a symmetric space and its dual can be identified. For symmetric spaces of noncompact type arising as homogeneous spaces of a semisimple Lie group, the restricted root system and its Weyl group are related to the Iwasawa decomposition of the Lie group.

== See also ==
- Satake diagram
