= Split Lie algebra =

In the mathematical field of Lie theory, a split Lie algebra is a pair $(\mathfrak{g}, \mathfrak{h})$ where $\mathfrak{g}$ is a Lie algebra and $\mathfrak{h} < \mathfrak{g}$ is a splitting Cartan subalgebra, where "splitting" means that for all $x \in \mathfrak{h}$, $\operatorname{ad}_{\mathfrak{g}} x$ is triangularizable. If a Lie algebra admits a splitting, it is called a splittable Lie algebra. Note that for reductive Lie algebras, the Cartan subalgebra is required to contain the center.

Over an algebraically closed field such as the complex numbers, all semisimple Lie algebras are splittable (indeed, not only does the Cartan subalgebra act by triangularizable matrices, but even stronger, it acts by diagonalizable ones) and all splittings are conjugate; thus split Lie algebras are of most interest for non-algebraically closed fields.

Split Lie algebras are of interest both because they formalize the split real form of a complex Lie algebra, and because split semisimple Lie algebras (more generally, split reductive Lie algebras) over any field share many properties with semisimple Lie algebras over algebraically closed fields – having essentially the same representation theory, for instance – the splitting Cartan subalgebra playing the same role as the Cartan subalgebra plays over algebraically closed fields. This is the approach followed in (Bourbaki 2005), for instance.

== Properties ==
- Over an algebraically closed field, all Cartan subalgebras are conjugate. Over a non-algebraically closed field, not all Cartan subalgebras are conjugate in general; however, in a splittable semisimple Lie algebra all splitting Cartan algebras are conjugate.
- Over an algebraically closed field, all semisimple Lie algebras are splittable.
- Over a non-algebraically closed field, there exist non-splittable semisimple Lie algebras.
- In a splittable Lie algebra, there may exist Cartan subalgebras that are not splitting.
- Direct sums of splittable Lie algebras and ideals in splittable Lie algebras are splittable.

=== Split real Lie algebras ===
For a real Lie algebra, splittable is equivalent to either of these conditions:

- The real rank equals the complex rank.
- The Satake diagram has neither black vertices nor arrows.

Every complex semisimple Lie algebra has a unique (up to isomorphism) split real Lie algebra, which is also semisimple, and is simple if and only if the complex Lie algebra is.

For real semisimple Lie algebras, split Lie algebras are opposite to compact Lie algebras – the corresponding Lie group is "as far as possible" from being compact.

== Examples ==
The split real forms for the complex semisimple Lie algebras are:

- $A_n, \mathfrak{sl}_{n+1}(\mathbf{C}): \mathfrak{sl}_{n+1}(\mathbf{R})$
- $B_n, \mathfrak{so}_{2n+1}(\mathbf{C}): \mathfrak{so}_{n,n+1}(\mathbf{R})$
- $C_n, \mathfrak{sp}_n(\mathbf{C}): \mathfrak{sp}_n(\mathbf{R})$
- $D_n, \mathfrak{so}_{2n}(\mathbf{C}): \mathfrak{so}_{n,n}(\mathbf{R})$
- Exceptional Lie algebras: $E_6, E_7, E_8, F_4, G_2$ have split real forms EI, EV, EVIII, FI, G.

These are the Lie algebras of the split real groups of the complex Lie groups.

Note that for $\mathfrak{sl}$ and $\mathfrak{sp}$, the real form is the real points of (the Lie algebra of) the same algebraic group, while for $\mathfrak{so}$ one must use the split forms (of maximally indefinite index), as the group SO is compact.

== See also ==
- Compact Lie algebra
- Real form
- Split-complex number
- Split orthogonal group
