= Simple Lie algebra =

Concept in Lie algebra mathematics

In algebra, a simple Lie algebra is a Lie algebra that is non-abelian and contains no nonzero proper ideals. The classification of real simple Lie algebras is one of the major achievements of Wilhelm Killing and Élie Cartan.

Over a field of characteristic 0, a direct sum of simple Lie algebras is called a semisimple Lie algebra.

A simple Lie group is a connected Lie group whose Lie algebra is simple.

== Complex simple Lie algebras ==
A finite-dimensional simple complex Lie algebra is isomorphic to either of the following: $\mathfrak{sl}_n \mathbb{C}$, $\mathfrak{so}_n \mathbb{C}$, $\mathfrak{sp}_{2n} \mathbb{C}$ (classical Lie algebras) or one of the five exceptional Lie algebras.

To each finite-dimensional complex semisimple Lie algebra $\mathfrak{g}$, there exists a corresponding diagram (called the Dynkin diagram) where the nodes denote the simple roots, the nodes are jointed (or not jointed) by a number of lines depending on the angles between the simple roots and the arrows are put to indicate whether the roots are longer or shorter. The Dynkin diagram of $\mathfrak{g}$ is connected if and only if $\mathfrak{g}$ is simple. All possible connected Dynkin diagrams are the following:

where n is the number of the nodes (the simple roots). The correspondence of the diagrams and complex simple Lie algebras is as follows:

(A_{n}) $\quad \mathfrak{sl}_{n+1} \mathbb{C}$
(B_{n}) $\quad \mathfrak{so}_{2n+1} \mathbb{C}$
(C_{n}) $\quad \mathfrak{sp}_{2n} \mathbb{C}$
(D_{n}) $\quad \mathfrak{so}_{2n} \mathbb{C}$
The rest, exceptional Lie algebras.

== Real simple Lie algebras ==
If $\mathfrak{g}_0$ is a finite-dimensional real simple Lie algebra, its complexification is either (1) simple or (2) a product of a simple complex Lie algebra and its conjugate. For example, the complexification of $\mathfrak{sl}_n \mathbb{C}$ thought of as a real Lie algebra is $\mathfrak{sl}_n \mathbb{C} \times \overline{\mathfrak{sl}_n \mathbb{C}}$. Thus, a real simple Lie algebra can be classified by the classification of complex simple Lie algebras and some additional information. This can be done by Satake diagrams that generalize Dynkin diagrams. See also Table of Lie groups#Real Lie algebras for a partial list of real simple Lie algebras.

== See also ==
- Simple Lie group
- Vogel plane
