= Vogan diagram =

In mathematics, a Vogan diagram, named after David Vogan, is a variation of the Dynkin diagram of a real semisimple Lie algebra that indicates the maximal compact subgroup. Although they resemble Satake diagrams they are a different way of classifying simple Lie algebras.
