= List of irreducible Tits indices =

In the mathematical theory of linear algebraic groups, a Tits index (or index) is an object used to classify semisimple algebraic groups defined over a base field k, not assumed to be algebraically closed. The possible irreducible indices were classified by Jacques Tits, and this classification is reproduced below. (Because every index is a direct sum of irreducible indices, classifying all indices amounts to classifying irreducible indices.)

== Organization of the list ==
An index can be represented as a Dynkin diagram with certain vertices drawn close to each other (the orbit of the vertices under the *-action of the Galois group of k) and with certain sets of vertices circled (the orbits of the non-distinguished vertices under the *-action). This representation captures the full information of the index except when the underlying Dynkin diagram is D_{4}, in which case one must distinguish between an action by the cyclic group C_{3} or the permutation group S_{3}.

Alternatively, an index can be represented using the name of the underlying Dynkin diagram together with additional superscripts and subscripts, to be explained momentarily. This representation, together with the labeled Dynkin diagram described in the previous paragraph, captures the full information of the index.

The notation for an index is of the form ^{g}X^{t}_{n,r}, where

- X is the letter of the underlying Dynkin diagram (A, B, C, D, E, F, or G),
- n is the number of vertices of the Dynkin diagram,
- r is the relative rank of the corresponding algebraic group,
- g is the order of the quotient of the absolute Galois group that acts faithfully on the Dynkin diagram (so g = 1, 2, 3, or 6), and
- t is either
  - the degree of a certain division algebra (that is, the square root of its dimension) arising in the construction of the algebraic group when the group is of classical type (A, B, C, or D), in which case t is written in parentheses, or
  - the dimension of the anisotropic kernel of the algebraic group when the group is of exceptional type (E, F, or G), in which case t is written without parentheses.

In the description, there are given (only for classical groups), a representative of the isogeny class of the group of the given Tits index.

The following complete list of all possible Tits indices over those special fields, which are the finite fields, the local and global fields (in any characteristic) is given (see and (with full proof)).

The related sources are, and.

== A_{n} ==
=== ^{1}A_{n} ===
Full name
^{1}A^{(d)}_{n,r}

Image

Conditions
d · (r + 1) = n + 1, d ≥ 1.

Distinguished vertices
d, 2d, ... , rd.

Description
Algebraic group : The special linear group SL_{r+1}(D) where D is a central division algebra over k.

Special fields
Over a finite field, d = 1; over the reals, d = 1 or 2; over a p-adic field or a number field, or any local or global function field, d is arbitrary.

=== ^{2}A_{n} ===
Full name
^{2}A^{(d)}_{n,r}

Image

Conditions
d | n + 1, d ≥ 1, 2rd ≤ n + 1.

Distinguished vertices
$(d,n+1-d),(2d,n+1-2d),...,(rd,n+1-rd)$.

Description
Algebraic group : The special unitary group SU_{(n+1)/d}(D,h), where D is a central division algebra of degree d over a separable quadratic extension k' of k, and where h is a nondegenerate hermitian form of index r relative to the unique non-trivial k-automorphism of k' .

Special fields
Over a finite field, d = 1 and r = ⌊(n+1)/2⌋; over the reals, d = 1; over a p-adic field or local function field, d = 1 and n = 2r − 1, 2r, 2r+1. Over a real number field, d and r are arbitrary; over a totally imaginary number field, d=1 and n = 2r − 1, 2r, 2r+1, or d>1 and (n+1)/d−2r =0,1; over a global function field, d=1 and n = 2r, 2r+1, 2r+2, or d>1 and (n+1)/d−2r =0,1.

== B_{n} ==
Full name
B_{n,r}

Image

Conditions
None.

Distinguished vertices
1, 2, ... , r.

Description
Algebraic group : The special orthogonal group SO_{2n+1}(k,q), where q is a quadratic form of index r, and defect 1 if k has characteristic 2.

Special fields
Over a finite field, r = n; over a p-adic field or local function field, r = n or n − 1 (and if char.k=2, defect 1); over the reals or a real number field, r is arbitrary; over a totally imaginary number field or a global function field, r = n or n − 1 (and if char.k=2, defect 1).

== C_{n} ==
Full name: C^{(d)}_{n,r}

Image:

Conditions: d = 2^{a} | 2n, d ≥ 1; n = r if d = 1.

Distinguished vertices: d, 2d,...,rd.

Description: Algebraic group: The special unitary group SU_{2n/d}(D,h), where D is a division algebra of degree d over k and h is a nondegenerate antihermitian form relative to a k-linear involution σ of D (also called an "involution of the first kind") such that the fixed-point subring D^{σ} has dimension d(d + 1)/2; or equivalently, when d > 1 and char k ≠ 2, the group SU_{2n/d} where D and h are as above except that h is hermitian and D^{σ} has dimension d(d − 1)/2. When d = 1, this group is the symplectic group Sp_{2n}(k).

Special fields: Over a finite field, d = 1; over the reals or a real number field, d = 1 (and r = n) or d = 2; over a p-adic field, local function field, totally imaginary number field or global function field, d = 1 (and r = n) or d = 2, and n = 2r or 2r − 1.

== D_{n} ==
=== ^{1}D_{n} ===
Full name
^{1}D^{(d)}_{n,r}

Image

Conditions
d = 2^{a} | 2n, d ≥ 1, rd ≤ n, n ≠ rd + 1.

Distinguished vertices
d, 2d, ..., rd.

Description
Algebraic group : If k has characteristic ≠ 2, the special unitary group SU_{2n/d}(D,h), where D is a division algebra of degree d over k and h is a hermitian form of discriminant 1 and index r, relative to a k-linear involution σ of D, an "involution of the first kind such that the subring D^{σ} has dimension d(d + 1)/2; or equivalently, when d > 1 and char k ≠ 2, the group SU_{2n/d} where D and h are as above except that h is anti-hermitian form of discriminant 1 and index r, and D^{σ} has dimension d(d − 1)/2.

Special fields
Over a finite field, d = 1 and n = r; over the reals, d = 1 and n − r = 2m, or d = 2 and n = 2r; over a p-adic field or local function field, d = 1 and r = n or n − 2, or d = 2 and n = 2r or 2r + 3; over a number field, d = 1 and n − r = 2m, or d = 2 and n − 2r = 2m or 3; over a totally imaginary number field or a global function field, d=1 and $n-r=0,2,$ or $d=2$ and $n-2r=0,3.$

=== ^{2}D_{n} ===
Full name
^{2}D^{(d)}_{n,r}

Image

Conditions
d = 2^{a} | 2n, d ≥ 1, rd ≤ n-1.

Distinguished vertices
d, 2d, ... , rd. The last one is replaced by $(n-1,n)$ when $n=rd+1.$

Description
Algebraic group : The same as for ^{1}D^{(d)}_{n,r}, except that all forms

in question have now discriminant ≠ 1.

Special fields
Over a finite field, $d=1, n=r+1$; over the reals, $d=1,n-r=2m+1$ or $d=2,n=2r+1.$ Over

a p-adic or local function field, $d=1, n = r + 1$, or $d=2, n-2r=1,2,3$; over a real number field, $d=1,r$ is arbitrary, $d=2,n-2r=1,2,3,$ if D is non-split over the reals, and $d=2,r$ arbitrary, if D is split over the reals. Over a totally imaginary number field or global function field, $d=1,n-r=2,4$ or $d=2,n-2r=1,2,3$.

=== ^{3}D^{28}_{4,0} ===
Image

Special fields
This type exists only over some number fields; does not exist over the finite fields, local fields nor global function fields.

=== ^{6}D^{28}_{4,0} ===
Image

Special fields
This type exists only over some number fields; does not exist over the finite fields, local fields nor global function fields.

=== ^{3}D^{9}_{4,1} ===
Image

Special fields
This type exists only over some number fields; does not exist over the finite fields, local fields nor global function fields.

=== ^{6}D^{9}_{4,1} ===
Image

Special fields
This type exists only over some number fields; does not exist over the finite fields, local fields nor global function fields.

=== ^{3}D^{2}_{4,2} ===
Image

Special fields
This type exists over any finite field, any local non-archimedean and global field; does not exist over the reals.

=== ^{6}D^{2}_{4,2} ===
Image

Special fields
This type exists over any local non-archimedean and global field; does not exist over the finite fields nor the reals.

== E_{6} ==
=== ^{1}E^{78}_{6,0} ===
Image:

Special fields: This type exists only over some number fields; does not exist over the finite fields, local fields nor global function fields.

=== ^{1}E^{28}_{6,2} ===
Image:

Special fields: This type exists only over the reals and over some number fields; does not exist over any finite field, nor over any local non-archimedean field, nor over any global function field.

=== ^{1}E^{16}_{6,2} ===
Image:

Special fields: This type exists only over some local non-archimedean and global fields; does not exist over the finite fields, nor over the reals.

=== ^{1}E^{0}_{6,6} ===
Image:

Special fields: This type exists over any field.

=== ^{2}E^{78}_{6,0} ===
Image:

Special fields: This type exists only over the reals and over some number fields; does not exist over any finite field, nor over any local non-archimedean field, nor over any global function field.

=== ^{2}E^{35}_{6,1} ===
Image:

Special fields: This type exists only over some number fields; does not exist over the reals, nor over any finite field, nor over any local field nor global function field.

=== ^{2}E^{29}_{6,1} ===
Image:

Special fields: This type exists only over some number fields; does not exist over the reals, nor over any finite field, nor over any local field, nor over any global function field.

=== ^{2}E^{16'}_{6,2} ===
Image:

Special fields: This type exists only over the reals and over some number fields; does not exist over any finite field, nor over any local non-archimedean field, nor over any global function field.

=== ^{2}E^{16"}_{6,2} ===
Image:

Special fields: This type exists only over some number fields; does not exist over any finite field, nor over any local field, nor over any global function field.

=== ^{2}E^{2}_{6,4} ===
Image:

Special fields: This type exists over any finite field, any local and global field.

== E_{7} ==
=== E^{133}_{7,0} ===
Image:

Special fields: This type exists only over the reals and over some number fields; does not exist over any finite field, nor over any local non-archimedean field, nor over any global function field.

=== E^{78}_{7,1} ===
Image:

Special fields: This type does not exist over any finite field, nor over any local field, nor over any global field.

=== E^{66}_{7,1} ===
Image:

Special fields: This type does not exist over any finite field, nor over any local field, nor over any global field.

=== E^{48}_{7,1} ===
Image:

Special fields: This type does not exist over any finite field, nor over any local field, nor over any global field.

=== E^{31}_{7,2} ===
Image:

Special fields: This type exists only over some number fields; does not exist over any finite field, nor over any local field, nor over any global field.

=== E^{28}_{7,3} ===
Image:

Special fields: This type exists only over the reals and over some number fields; does not exist over any finite field, nor over any local non-archimedean field, nor over any global function field.

=== E^{9}_{7,4} ===
Image:

Special fields: This type does not exist over any finite field; it exists over any local and global field.

=== E^{0}_{7,7} ===
Image:

Special fields: This type exists over any field.

== E_{8} ==
=== E^{248}_{8,0} ===
Image:

Special fields: This type exists only over the reals and over some number fields; does not exist over any finite field, nor local non-archimedean field, nor global function field.

=== E^{133}_{8,1} ===
Image:

Special fields: This type does not exist over any finite field, nor over any local field, nor over any global field.

=== E^{91}_{8,1} ===
Image:

Special fields: This type does not exist over any finite field, nor over any local field, nor over any global field.

=== E^{78}_{8,2} ===
Image:

Special fields: This type does not exist over any finite field, nor over any local field, nor any global field.

=== E^{66}_{8,2} ===
Image:

Special fields: This type does not exist over any finite field, nor over any local non-archimedean, nor over any global field.

=== E^{28}_{8,4} ===
Image:

Special fields: This type exists only over the reals and over some number fields; does not exist over any finite field, nor over any local non-archimedean, nor over any global function field.

=== E^{0}_{8,8} ===
Image:

Special fields: This type exists over any field.

== F_{4} ==
=== F^{52}_{4,0} ===
Image:

Description: Algebraic Group: The automorphism group of an exceptional simple Jordan algebra J that does not contain nonzero nilpotent elements.

Special fields: This type exists only over the reals and over some number fields; does not exist over any finite field, nor over any local non-archimedean, nor over any global function field.

=== F^{21}_{4,1} ===
Image:

Description: Algebraic Group: The automorphism group of an exceptional simple Jordan algebra J containing nonzero nilpotent elements, no two of which are nonproportional and orthogonal.

Special fields: This type exists only over the reals and over some number fields; does not exist over any finite field, nor over any local non-archimedean, nor over any global function field.

=== F^{0}_{4,4} ===
Image:

Description: Algebraic Group: The automorphism group of an exceptional simple Jordan algebra J containing nonproportional orthogonal nilpotent elements.

Special fields: This type exists over any field.

== G_{2} ==
A group of type G_{2} is always the automorphism group of an octonion algebra.

=== G^{14}_{2,0} ===
Image:

Description: Algebraic group: the automorphism group of a division octonion algebra.

Special fields: This type exists over the reals and some number fields; does not exist over any finite field, nor over any local non-archimedean, nor over any global function field.

=== G^{0}_{2,2} ===
Image:

Description: Algebraic group: the automorphism group of a split octonion algebra.

Special fields: This type exists over any field.
