= Eugene Dynkin =

Russian mathematician (1924–2014)

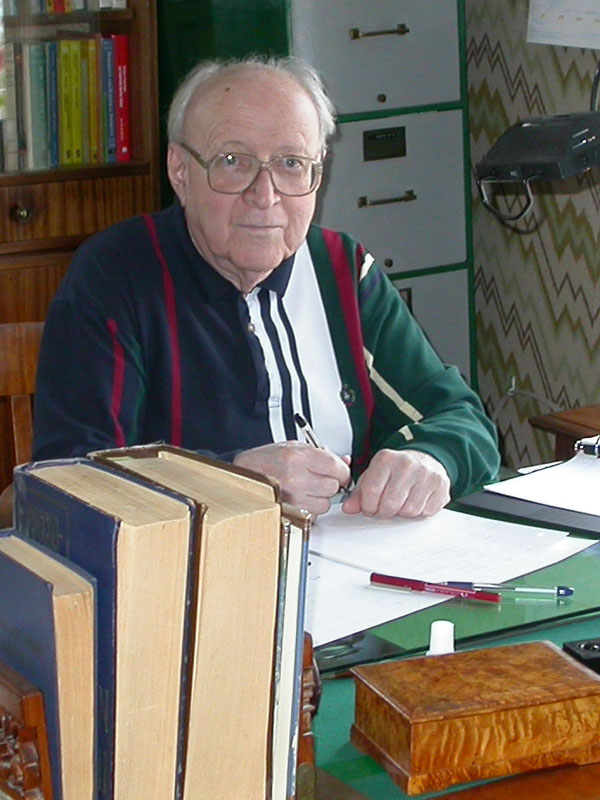
- Eugene Dynkin at home in 2003. Photo courtesy of the Dynkin Collection.
- Born: Eugene Borisovich Dynkin; 11 May 1924; Leningrad, Soviet Union
- Died: 14 November 2014 (aged 90); Ithaca, New York, United States
- Citizenship: United States
- Education: Moscow University
- Awards: Leroy P. Steele Prize (1993)
- Scientific career
- Fields: Mathematics
- Workplaces: Moscow University; Central Economic Mathematical Institute; Cornell University
- Doctoral advisor: Andrey Kolmogorov
- Doctoral students: Nicolai V. Krylov; Igor Girsanov; Fridrikh Karpelevich; Stanislav Molchanov; Anatoliy Skorokhod; Nikolai Chentsov; Robert Vanderbei; Ernest Vinberg

Eugene Borisovich Dynkin (Russian: Евгений Борисович Дынкин; 11 May 1924 – 14 November 2014) was a Soviet and American mathematician. He made contributions to the fields of probability and algebra, especially semisimple Lie groups, Lie algebras, and Markov processes. The Dynkin diagram, the Dynkin system, and Dynkin's lemma are named after him.

== Biography ==
Dynkin was born into a Jewish family, living in Leningrad until 1935, when his family was exiled to Kazakhstan. Two years later, when Dynkin was 13, his father disappeared in the Gulag.

=== Moscow University ===
At the age of 16, in 1940, Dynkin was admitted to Moscow University. He avoided military service in World War II because of his poor eyesight, and received his MS in 1945 and his PhD in 1948. He became an assistant professor at Moscow, but was not awarded a "chair" until 1954 because of his political undesirability. His academic progress was made difficult due to his father's fate, as well as Dynkin's Jewish origin; the special efforts of Andrey Kolmogorov, his PhD supervisor, made it possible for Dynkin to progress through graduate school into a teaching position.

=== USSR Academy of Sciences ===
In 1968, Dynkin was forced to transfer from the Moscow University to the Central Economic Mathematical Institute of the USSR Academy of Sciences. He worked there on the theory of economic growth and economic equilibrium.

=== Cornell ===
He remained at the Institute until 1976, when he emigrated to the United States. In 1977, he became a professor at Cornell University.

=== Death ===
Dynkin died at the Cayuga Medical Center in Ithaca, New York, aged 90. Dynkin was an atheist.

== Mathematical work ==
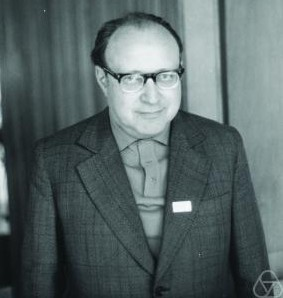
Eugene Dynkin, 1976

Dynkin is considered to be a rare example of a mathematician who made fundamental contributions to two very distinct areas of mathematics: algebra and probability theory. The algebraic period of Dynkin's mathematical work was between 1944 and 1954, though even during this time a probabilistic theme was noticeable. Indeed, Dynkin's first publication was in 1945, jointly with N. A. Dmitriev, solved a problem on the eigenvalues of stochastic matrices. This problem was raised at Kolmogorov's seminar on Markov chains, while both Dynkin and Dmitriev were undergraduates.

=== Lie Theory ===
While Dynkin was a student at Moscow University, he attended Israel Gelfand's seminar on Lie groups. In 1944, Gelfand asked him to prepare a survey on the structure and classification of semisimple Lie groups, based on the papers by Hermann Weyl and Bartel Leendert van der Waerden. Dynkin found the papers difficult to read, and in an attempt to better understand the results, he invented the notion of a "simple root" in a root system. He represented the pairwise angles between these simple roots in the form of a Dynkin diagram. In this way he obtained a cleaner exposition of the classification of complex semisimple Lie algebras. Of Dynkin's 1947 paper "Structure of semisimple Lie algebras", Bertram Kostant wrote:

In this paper, using only elementary mathematics, and starting with almost nothing, Dynkin, brilliantly and elegantly developed the structure and machinery of semisimple Lie algebras. What he accomplished in this paper was to take a hitherto esoteric subject, and to make it into beautiful and powerful mathematics.

— Bertram Kostant, "Selected papers", p. 363

Dynkin's 1952 influential paper "Semisimple subalgebras of semisimple Lie algebras", contained large tables and lists, and studied the subalgebras of the exceptional Lie algebras.

=== Probability theory ===
Dynkin is considered one of the founders of the modern theory of Markov processes. The results obtained by Dynkin and other participants of his seminar at Moscow University were summarized in two books. The first of these, "Theory of Markov Processes", was published in 1959, and laid the foundations of the theory.

Dynkin's one-hour talk at the 1962 International Congress of Mathematicians in Stockholm, was delivered by Kolmogorov, since prior to his emigration, Dynkin was never permitted to travel to the West. This talk was titled "Markov processes and problems in analysis".

== Prizes and awards ==
- Prize of the Moscow Mathematical Society, 1951
- Institute of Mathematical Statistics, Fellow, 1962
- American Academy of Arts and Sciences, Fellow, 1978
- National Academy of Sciences of the USA, Member, 1985
- American Mathematical Society, Leroy P. Steele Prize for Total Mathematical Work, 1993
- Moscow Mathematical Society, Honorary Member, 1995
- Doctor Honoris Causa of the Pierre and Marie Curie University (Paris 6), 1997
- Doctor of Science (honoris causa) of the University of Warwick, 2003.
- Doctor Honoris Causa of the Independent Moscow University (Russia), 2003
- Fellow of the American Mathematical Society, 2012

== Publications ==
- Theory of Markov Processes. Prentice-Hall. 1961.
- Die Grundlagen der Theorie der Markoffschen Prozesse. Grundlehren der mathematischen Wissenschaften, Band 108. Springer Verlag. 1961.
- Markov Processes. Grundlehren der mathematischen Wissenschaften. Springer Verlag. 1965.
- Controlled Markov Processes. Grundlehren der mathematischen Wissenschaften. Springer Verlag. 1979.
- Markov Processes and Related Problems of Analysis, Selected Papers. London Math. Soc. Lecture Notes Series, 54. Cambridge University Press. 1982.
- Dynkin, Eugene B. (2000). Yushkevich, A. A.; Seitz, G. M.; Onishchik, A. L. (eds.). Selected papers of E. B. Dynkin with commentary. Providence, R.I.: American Mathematical Society. ISBN 978-0-8218-1065-1. MR 1757976.
- Diffusions, Superdiffusions and Partial Differential Equations. AMS Colloquium Publications. 2002.
- Superdiffusions and Positive Solutions of Nonlinear Partial Differential Equations. American Mathematical Society. 2004.

== See also ==
Algebra

- Affine Dynkin diagram
- Coxeter–Dynkin diagram
- Dynkin index
- Dynkin–Specht–Wever Lemma

Probability

- Dynkin's card trick
- Dynkin's formula
- Dynkin system
