= Satake diagram =

Term in mathematics

In the mathematical study of Lie algebras and Lie groups, Satake diagrams are a generalization of Dynkin diagrams that classify involutions of root systems that are relevant in several contexts. They were introduced in Satake (1960, p. 109) and were originally used to classify real simple Lie algebras. Additionally, they also classify symmetric pairs $(\mathfrak{g},\mathfrak{k})$ of Lie algebras, where $\mathfrak{g}$ is semisimple.

More concretely, given a complex semisimple Lie algebra $\mathfrak{g}$, the Satake diagrams made from $\mathfrak{g}$'s Dynkin diagram classify the involutions of $\mathfrak{g}$'s root system that extend to an anti-linear involutive automorphism σ of $\mathfrak{g}$. The fixed points $\mathfrak{g}^\sigma$ are then a real form of $\mathfrak{g}$. The same Satake diagrams also classify the involutions of $\mathfrak{g}$'s root system that extend to a (linear) involutive automorphism σ of $\mathfrak{g}$. The fixed points $\mathfrak{k}$ form a complex Lie subalgebra of $\mathfrak{g}$, so that $(\mathfrak{g},\mathfrak{k})$ is a symmetric pair.

More generally, the Tits index or Satake–Tits diagram of a reductive algebraic group over a field is a generalization of the Satake diagram to arbitrary fields, introduced by Tits (1966), that reduces the classification of reductive algebraic groups to that of anisotropic reductive algebraic groups.

Satake diagrams are distinct from Vogan diagrams although they look similar.

== Definition ==
Let V be a real vector space. A σ-root system $(R,\sigma)$ consists of a root system $R\subset V$ that spans V and a linear involution σ of V that satisfies $\sigma(R)=R$.

Let $R_\bullet\subset R$ be the set of roots fixed by σ and let
$$\Sigma := \left\{ \frac{\alpha-\sigma(\alpha)}{2}: \alpha\in R\setminus R_\bullet\right\}.$$
Σ is called the restricted root system.

The Satake diagram of a σ-root system $(R,\sigma)$ is obtained as follows: Let $\alpha_1,\dots,\alpha_n$ be simple roots of R such that $\alpha_{n+1-p},\dots,\alpha_n$ are simple roots of $R_\bullet$. We can define an involution τ of $\{1,\dots,n-p\}$ by having
$$\sigma(\alpha_i) = \alpha_{\tau(i)} + \Z R_\bullet\qquad
(i=1,\dots,n-p).$$
The Satake diagram is then obtained from the Dynkin diagram describing R by blackening the vertices corresponding to $\alpha_{n+1-p},\dots,\alpha_n$, and by drawing arrows between the white vertices that are interchanged by τ.

=== Satake diagram of a real semisimple Lie algebra ===
Let $\mathfrak{g}_\R$ be a real semisimple Lie algebra and let $\mathfrak{g}=\mathfrak{g}_\R\otimes\C$ be its complexification. Define the map
$$\sigma:\mathfrak{g}\to\mathfrak{g},\qquad
X\otimes z\mapsto X\otimes\overline{z}.$$
This is an anti-linear involutive automorphism of real Lie algebras and its fixed-point set is our original $\mathfrak{g}_\R$.

Let $\mathfrak{h}\le\mathfrak{g}$ be a Cartan subalgebra that satisfies $\sigma(\mathfrak{h})=\mathfrak{h}$ and is maximally split, i.e. when we split $\mathfrak{h}$ into σ-eigenspaces, the $-1$-eigenspace has maximal dimension. σ induces an anti-linear involution σ* on $\mathfrak{h}^*$:
$$\sigma^*(\lambda)(v) = \overline{\lambda(\sigma(v))}\qquad
(\lambda\in\mathfrak{h}^*,v\in\mathfrak{h}).$$
If $X\in\mathfrak{g}_\alpha$ is a root vector, one can show that $\sigma(X)\in\mathfrak{g}_{\sigma^*(\alpha)}$. Consequently, σ* preserves the root system R of $\mathfrak{g}$. We thus obtain a σ-root system $(R,\sigma^*)$ whose Satake diagram is the Satake diagram of $\mathfrak{g}_\R$.

=== Satake diagram of a symmetric pair ===
Let $(\mathfrak{g},\mathfrak{k})$ be a symmetric pair of complex Lie algebras where $\mathfrak{g}$ is semisimple, i.e. let θ be an involutive Lie algebra automorphism of $\mathfrak{g}$ and let $\mathfrak{k}$ be its fixed-point set. It is shown in Kolb (2014, Appendix A) that these symmetric pairs (even for $\mathfrak{g}$ an infinite-dimensional Kac-Moody algebra), or equivalently these involutive automorphisms, can be classified using so-called admissible pairs. These admissible pairs describe again a σ-root system that can be obtained from the automorphism σ, and the Satake diagrams that arise this way are exactly the ones listed in Araki (1962, pp. 32, 33) and the Satake diagrams obtained by blackening all vertices.

Definition Given a Dynkin diagram with vertex set I, an admissible pair $(I_\bullet, \tau)$ consists of a subset $I_\bullet$ of finite type and a diagram automorphism τ satisfying

- $\tau^2=\operatorname{id}$
- $\tau(I_\bullet)=I_\bullet$
- The permutation $\tau|_{I_\bullet}$ coincides with $-w_\bullet$ (where $w_\bullet$ is the longest element of the Weyl group generated by the vertices in $I_\bullet$)
- For $j\in I\setminus I_\bullet$ with $\tau(i)=i$, we have $\alpha_j(\rho^\vee_\bullet)\in\Z$, where
  $$\rho^\vee_\bullet = \frac{1}{2}\sum_{\alpha\in R_\bullet^+} \alpha^\vee.$$

Given an admissible pair $(I_\bullet,\tau)$, we can define a σ-root system by equipping the root system R of I with the involution $\sigma = -w_\bullet\circ\tau$

== Classification of Satake diagrams ==
In Araki (1962, §5) it is proven that every Satake diagram arising from a real semisimple Lie algebra (equivalently: symmetric pair $(\mathfrak{g},\mathfrak{k})$ with $\mathfrak{g}$ semisimple) is a disconnected union of

- two times the same Dynkin diagram (with white vertices), with arrows matching the vertices
- one of the following diagrams:

Connected irreducible Satake diagrams
Name	Diagram	Type of restricted root system	Example real semisimple Lie algebra	Example symmetric pair ($\C$ omitted)
$\mathsf{AI}_n$		$\mathsf{A}_n$	$\mathfrak{sl}(n+1)$	$(\mathfrak{sl}(n+1),\mathfrak{so}(n+1))$
$\mathsf{AII}_{2p+1}$		$\mathsf{A}_p$	$\mathfrak{su}^*(2p+2)$	$(\mathfrak{sl}(2p+2), \mathfrak{sp}(2p))$
$\mathsf{AIII}_{n,p}\quad (4\le 2p\le n)$		$\mathsf{BC}_p$	$\mathfrak{su}(p,n+1-p)$	$(\mathfrak{sl}(n+1), \mathfrak{s}(\mathfrak{gl}(p)\oplus\mathfrak{gl}(n+1-p)))$
$\mathsf{AIII}_{2p-1,p}$		$\mathsf{C}_p$	$\mathfrak{su}(p,p)$	$(\mathfrak{sl}(2p), \mathfrak{s}(\mathfrak{gl}(p)\oplus\mathfrak{gl}(p)))$
$\mathsf{AIV}_n$		$\mathsf{BC}_1$	$\mathfrak{su}(n,1)$	$(\mathfrak{sl}(n+1),\mathfrak{gl}(n))$
$\mathsf{BI}_{n,p}\quad (2\le p\le n)$		$\mathsf{B}_p$	$\mathfrak{so}(p,2n+1-p)$	$(\mathfrak{so}(2n+1),\mathfrak{so}(p)\oplus\mathfrak{so}(2n+1-p))$
$\mathsf{BII}_n$		$\mathsf{A}_1$	$\mathfrak{so}(2n,1)$	$(\mathfrak{so}(2n+1),\mathfrak{so}(2n))$
$\mathsf{CI}_n$		$\mathsf{C}_n$	$sp(2n)$	$(\mathfrak{sp}(2n), \mathfrak{gl}(2n))$
$\mathsf{CII}_{n,p}\quad (2\le 2p\le n-1)$		$\mathsf{BC}_p$	$\mathfrak{sp}(2p, 2n-2p)$	$(\mathfrak{sp}(2n), \mathfrak{sp}(2p)\oplus\mathfrak{sp}(2n-2p))$
$\mathsf{CII}_{2p,p}$		$\mathsf{C}_p$	$\mathfrak{sp}(2p,2p)$	$(\mathfrak{sp}(4p), \mathfrak{sp}(2p)\oplus\mathfrak{sp}(2p))$
$\mathsf{DI}_{n,p}\quad (2\le p\le n-2)$		$\mathsf{B}_p$	$\mathfrak{so}(p,2n-p)$	$(\mathfrak{so}(2n),\mathfrak{so}(p)\oplus\mathfrak{so}(2n-p))$
$\mathsf{DI}_{n,n-1}$		$\mathsf{B}_{n-1}$	$\mathfrak{so}(n-1, n+1)$	$(\mathfrak{so}(2n),\mathfrak{so}(n-1)\oplus\mathfrak{so}(n+1))$
$\mathsf{DI}_{n,n}$		$\mathsf{D}_n$	$\mathfrak{so}(n,n)$	$(\mathfrak{so}(2n),\mathfrak{so}(n)\oplus\mathfrak{so}(n))$
$\mathsf{DII}_n$		$\mathsf{A}_1$	$\mathfrak{so}(2n-1,1)$	$(\mathfrak{so}(2n),\mathfrak{so}(2n-1))$
$\mathsf{DIII}_{2p}$		$\mathsf{C}_p$	$\mathfrak{so}^*(4p)$	$(\mathfrak{so}(4p),\mathfrak{gl}(2p))$
$\mathsf{DIII}_{2p+1}$		$\mathsf{BC}_p$	$\mathfrak{so}^*(4p+2)$	$(\mathfrak{so}(4p+2),\mathfrak{gl}(2p+1))$
$\mathsf{EI}$		$\mathsf{E}_6$	$\mathfrak{e}_{6,6}$	$(\mathfrak{e}_6,\mathfrak{sp}(8))$
$\mathsf{EII}$		$\mathsf{F}_4$	$\mathfrak{e}_{6,2}$	$(\mathfrak{e}_6,\mathfrak{sl}(6)\oplus\mathfrak{sl}(2))$
$\mathsf{EIII}$		$\mathsf{BC}_2$	$\mathfrak{e}_{6,-14}$	$(\mathfrak{e}_6, \mathfrak{so}(10)\oplus\C)$
$\mathsf{EIV}$		$\mathsf{A}_2$	$\mathfrak{e}_{6,-26}$	$(\mathfrak{e}_6,\mathfrak{f}_4)$
$\mathsf{EV}$		$\mathsf{E}_7$	$\mathfrak{e}_{7,7}$	$(\mathfrak{e}_7,\mathfrak{sl}(8))$
$\mathsf{EVI}$		$\mathsf{F}_4$	$\mathfrak{e}_{7,-5}$	$(\mathfrak{e}_7, \mathfrak{so}(12)\oplus\mathfrak{sl}(2))$
$\mathsf{EVII}$		$\mathsf{C}_3$	$\mathfrak{e}_{7,-25}$	$(\mathfrak{e}_7,\mathfrak{e}_6\oplus\C)$
$\mathsf{EVIII}$		$\mathsf{E}_8$	$\mathfrak{e}_{8,8}$	$(\mathfrak{e}_8,\mathfrak{so}(16))$
$\mathsf{EIX}$		$\mathsf{F}_4$	$\mathfrak{e}_{8,-24}$	$(\mathfrak{e}_8, \mathfrak{e}_7\oplus\mathfrak{sl}(2))$
$\mathsf{FI}$		$\mathsf{F}_4$	$\mathfrak{f}_{4,4}$	$(\mathfrak{f}_4,\mathfrak{sp}(6)\oplus\mathfrak{sl}(2))$
$\mathsf{FII}$		$\mathsf{BC}_1$	$\mathfrak{f}_{4,-20}$	$(\mathfrak{f}_4,\mathfrak{so}(9))$
$\mathsf{G}$		$\mathsf{G}_2$	$\mathfrak{g}_{2,2}$	$(\mathfrak{g}_2,\mathfrak{sl}(2)\oplus\mathfrak{sl}(2))$

== Examples ==
- Compact Lie algebras correspond to the Satake diagram with all vertices blackened. This corresponds to the symmetric pair $(\mathfrak{g},\mathfrak{g})$
- Split Lie algebras correspond to the Satake diagram with only white (i.e., non blackened) and unpaired vertices.
- A table can be found at (Onishchik & Vinberg 1994, Table 4, pp. 229–230).

== Differences between Satake and Vogan diagrams ==
Both Satake and Vogan diagrams are used to classify semisimple Lie groups or algebras (or algebraic groups) over the reals and both consist of Dynkin diagrams enriched by blackening a subset of the nodes and connecting some pairs of vertices by arrows. Satake diagrams, however, can be generalized to any field (see above) and fall under the general paradigm of Galois cohomology, whereas Vogan diagrams are defined specifically over the reals. Generally speaking, the structure of a real semisimple Lie algebra is encoded in a more transparent way in its Satake diagram, but Vogan diagrams are simpler to classify.

The essential difference is that the Satake diagram of a real semisimple Lie algebra $\mathfrak{g}$ with Cartan involution θ and associated Cartan pair $\mathfrak{g} = \mathfrak{k} \oplus \mathfrak{p}$ (the +1 and −1 eigenspaces of θ) is defined by starting from a maximally noncompact θ-stable Cartan subalgebra $\mathfrak{h}$, that is, one for which $\theta(\mathfrak{h})=\mathfrak{h}$ and $\mathfrak{h}\cap\mathfrak{k}$ is as small as possible (in the presentation above, $\mathfrak{h}$ appears as the Lie algebra of the maximal split torus S), whereas Vogan diagrams are defined starting from a maximally compact θ-stable Cartan subalgebra, that is, one for which $\theta(\mathfrak{h})=\mathfrak{h}$ and $\mathfrak{h}\cap\mathfrak{k}$ is as large as possible.

The unadorned Dynkin diagram (i.e., that with only white nodes and no arrows), when interpreted as a Satake diagram, represents the split real form of the Lie algebra, whereas it represents the compact form when interpreted as a Vogan diagram.

== Generalisation: Satake—Tits diagrams ==
Suppose that G is an algebraic group defined over a field k, such as the reals. We let S be a maximal split torus in G, and take T to be a maximal torus containing S defined over the separable algebraic closure K of k. Then G(K) has a Dynkin diagram with respect to some choice of positive roots of T. This Dynkin diagram has a natural action of the Galois group of K/k. Also some of the simple roots vanish on S. The Satake–Tits diagram is given by the Dynkin diagram D, together with the action of the Galois group, with the simple roots vanishing on S colored black. In the case when k is the field of real numbers, the absolute Galois group has order 2, and its action on D is represented by drawing conjugate points of the Dynkin diagram near each other, and the Satake–Tits diagram is called a Satake diagram.

== See also ==
- Relative root system
- List of irreducible Tits indices
