= Dynkin index =

In mathematics, the Dynkin index $I({\lambda})$ of finite-dimensional highest-weight representations of a compact simple Lie algebra $\mathfrak g$ relates their trace forms via

$\frac{\text{Tr}_{V_\lambda}}{\text{Tr}_{V_\mu}}= \frac{I(\lambda)}{I(\mu)}.$

In the particular case where $\lambda$ is the highest root, so that $V_\lambda$ is the adjoint representation, the Dynkin index $I(\lambda)$ is equal to the dual Coxeter number.

The notation $\text{Tr}_V$ is the trace form on the representation $\rho: \mathfrak{g} \rightarrow \text{End}(V)$. By Schur's lemma, since the trace forms are all invariant forms, they are related by constants, so the index is well-defined.

Since the trace forms are bilinear forms, we can take traces to obtain

$$I(\lambda)=\frac{\dim V_\lambda}{2\dim\mathfrak g}(\lambda, \lambda +2\rho)$$

where the Weyl vector

$$\rho=\frac{1}{2}\sum_{\alpha\in \Delta^+} \alpha$$

is equal to half of the sum of all the positive roots of $\mathfrak g$. The expression $(\lambda, \lambda +2\rho)$ is the value of the quadratic Casimir in the representation $V_\lambda$.

== See also ==
- Killing form
