= Classical Lie algebras =

The classical Lie algebras are finite-dimensional Lie algebras over a field which can be classified into four types $A_n$, $B_n$, $C_n$ and $D_n$, where for $\mathfrak{gl}(n)$ the general linear Lie algebra and $I_n$ the $n \times n$ identity matrix:

- $A_n := \mathfrak{sl}(n+1) = \{ x \in \mathfrak{gl}(n+1) : \text{tr}(x) = 0 \}$, the special linear Lie algebra;
- $B_n := \mathfrak{o}(2n+1) = \{ x \in \mathfrak{gl}(2n+1) : x + x^{T} = 0 \}$, the odd orthogonal Lie algebra;
- $$C_n := \mathfrak{sp}(2n) = \{ x \in \mathfrak{gl}(2n) : J_nx + x^{T}J_n = 0, J_n = \begin{pmatrix} 0 & I_n \\ -I_n & 0 \end{pmatrix} \}$$
  , the symplectic Lie algebra; and
- $D_n := \mathfrak{o}(2n) = \{ x \in \mathfrak{gl}(2n) : x + x^{T} = 0 \}$, the even orthogonal Lie algebra.

Except for the low-dimensional cases $D_1 = \mathfrak{so}(2)$ and $D_2 = \mathfrak{so}(4)$, the classical Lie algebras are simple.

The Moyal algebra is an infinite-dimensional Lie algebra that contains all classical Lie algebras as subalgebras.

== See also ==
- Simple Lie algebra
- Classical group
