= Negative definiteness =

In mathematics, negative definiteness is a property of any object to which a bilinear form may be naturally associated, which is negative-definite. See, in particular:

- Negative-definite bilinear form
- Negative-definite quadratic form
- Negative-definite matrix
- Negative-definite function
