= Lie's theorem =

Theorem representing a solvable Lie algebra

In mathematics, specifically the theory of Lie algebras, Lie's theorem states that, over an algebraically closed field of characteristic zero, if $\pi: \mathfrak{g} \to \mathfrak{gl}(V)$ is a finite-dimensional representation of a solvable Lie algebra, then there is a flag $V = V_0 \supset V_1 \supset \cdots \supset V_n = 0$ of invariant subspaces of $\pi(\mathfrak{g})$ with $\operatorname{codim} V_i = i$, meaning that $\pi(X)(V_i) \subseteq V_i$ for each $X \in \mathfrak{g}$ and i.

Put in another way, the theorem says there is a basis for V such that all linear transformations in $\pi(\mathfrak{g})$ are represented by upper triangular matrices. This is a generalization of the result of Frobenius that commuting matrices are simultaneously upper triangularizable, as commuting matrices generate an abelian Lie algebra, which is a fortiori solvable.

A consequence of Lie's theorem is that any finite dimensional solvable Lie algebra over a field of characteristic 0 has a nilpotent derived algebra (see #Consequences). Also, to each flag in a finite-dimensional vector space V, there correspond a Borel subalgebra (that consist of linear transformations stabilizing the flag); thus, the theorem says that $\pi(\mathfrak{g})$ is contained in some Borel subalgebra of $\mathfrak{gl}(V)$.

== Counter-example ==
For algebraically closed fields of characteristic p>0 Lie's theorem holds provided the dimension of the representation is less than p (see the proof below), but can fail for representations of dimension p. An example is given by the 3-dimensional nilpotent Lie algebra spanned by 1, x, and d/dx acting on the p-dimensional vector space k[x]/(x^{p}), which has no eigenvectors. Taking the semidirect product of this 3-dimensional Lie algebra by the p-dimensional representation (considered as an abelian Lie algebra) gives a solvable Lie algebra whose derived algebra is not nilpotent.

== Proof ==
The proof is by induction on the dimension of $\mathfrak{g}$ and consists of several steps. (Note: the structure of the proof is very similar to that for Engel's theorem.) The basic case is trivial and we assume the dimension of $\mathfrak{g}$ is positive. We also assume V is not zero. For simplicity, we write $X \cdot v = \pi(X)(v)$.

Step 1: Observe that the theorem is equivalent to the statement:

- There exists a vector in V that is an eigenvector for each linear transformation in $\pi(\mathfrak{g})$.

Indeed, the theorem says in particular that a nonzero vector spanning $V_{n-1}$ is a common eigenvector for all the linear transformations in $\pi(\mathfrak{g})$. Conversely, if v is a common eigenvector, take $V_{n-1}$ to be its span and then $\pi(\mathfrak{g})$ admits a common eigenvector in the quotient $V/V_{n-1}$; repeat the argument.

Step 2: Find an ideal $\mathfrak{h}$ of codimension one in $\mathfrak{g}$.

Let $D\mathfrak{g} = [\mathfrak{g}, \mathfrak{g}]$ be the derived algebra. Since $\mathfrak{g}$ is solvable and has positive dimension, $D\mathfrak{g} \ne \mathfrak{g}$ and so the quotient $\mathfrak{g}/D\mathfrak{g}$ is a nonzero abelian Lie algebra, which certainly contains an ideal of codimension one and by the ideal correspondence, it corresponds to an ideal of codimension one in $\mathfrak{g}$.

Step 3: There exists some linear functional $\lambda$ in $\mathfrak{h}^*$ such that

$$V_{\lambda} = \{ v \in V | X \cdot v = \lambda(X) v, X \in \mathfrak{h} \}$$

is nonzero. This follows from the inductive hypothesis (it is easy to check that the eigenvalues determine a linear functional).

Step 4: $V_{\lambda}$ is a $\mathfrak{g}$-invariant subspace. (Note this step proves a general fact and does not involve solvability.)

Let $Y \in \mathfrak{g}$, $v \in V_{\lambda}$, then we need to prove $Y \cdot v \in V_{\lambda}$. If $v = 0$ then it's obvious, so assume $v \ne 0$ and set recursively $v_0 = v, \, v_{i+1} = Y \cdot v_i$. Let $U = \operatorname{span} \{ v_i | i \ge 0 \}$ and $\ell \in \mathbb{N}_0$ be the largest such that $v_0,\ldots,v_\ell$ are linearly independent. Then we'll prove that they generate U and thus $\alpha = (v_0,\ldots,v_\ell)$ is a basis of U. Indeed, assume by contradiction that it's not the case and let $m \in \mathbb{N}_0$ be the smallest such that $v_m \notin \langle v_0,\ldots,v_\ell\rangle$, then obviously $m \ge \ell + 1$. Since $v_0,\ldots,v_{\ell+1}$ are linearly dependent, $v_{\ell+1}$ is a linear combination of $v_0,\ldots,v_\ell$. Applying the map $Y^{m-\ell-1}$ it follows that $v_m$ is a linear combination of $v_{m-\ell-1},\ldots,v_{m-1}$. Since by the minimality of m each of these vectors is a linear combination of $v_0,\ldots,v_\ell$, so is $v_m$, and we get the desired contradiction. We'll prove by induction that for every $n \in \mathbb{N}_0$ and $X \in \mathfrak{h}$ there exist elements $a_{0,n,X},\ldots,a_{n,n,X}$ of the base field such that $a_{n,n,X}=\lambda(X)$ and

$$X \cdot v_n = \sum_{i=0}^{n} a_{i,n,X}v_i.$$

The $n=0$ case is straightforward since $X \cdot v_0 = \lambda(X) v_0$. Now assume that we have proved the claim for some $n \in \mathbb{N}_0$ and all elements of $\mathfrak{h}$ and let $X \in \mathfrak{h}$. Since $\mathfrak{h}$ is an ideal, it's $[X,Y] \in \mathfrak{h}$, and thus

$$X \cdot v_{n+1} = Y \cdot (X \cdot v_n) + [X, Y] \cdot v_n = Y \cdot \sum_{i=0}^{n} a_{i,n,X}v_i + \sum_{i=0}^{n} a_{i,n,[X,Y]}v_i = a_{0,n,[X,Y]}v_0 + \sum_{i=1}^{n} (a_{i-1,n,X} + a_{i,n,[X,Y]})v_i + \lambda(X)v_{n+1},$$

and the induction step follows. This implies that for every $X \in \mathfrak{h}$ the subspace U is an invariant subspace of X and the matrix of the restricted map $\pi(X)|_U$ in the basis $\alpha$ is upper triangular with diagonal elements equal to $\lambda(X)$, hence $\operatorname{tr}(\pi(X)|_U) = \dim(U) \lambda(X)$. Applying this with $[X,Y] \in \mathfrak{h}$ instead of X gives $\operatorname{tr}(\pi([X,Y])|_U) = \dim(U) \lambda([X,Y])$. On the other hand, U is also obviously an invariant subspace of Y, and so

$$\operatorname{tr}(\pi([X,Y])|_U) = \operatorname{tr}([\pi(X),\pi(Y)]|_U]) = \operatorname{tr}([\pi(X)|_U, \pi(Y)|_U]) = 0$$

since commutators have zero trace, and thus $\dim(U) \lambda([X,Y]) = 0$. Since $\dim(U) > 0$ is invertible (because of the assumption on the characteristic of the base field), $\lambda([X, Y]) = 0$ and

$$X \cdot (Y \cdot v) = Y \cdot (X \cdot v) + [X, Y] \cdot v = Y \cdot (\lambda(X) v) + \lambda([X, Y]) v = \lambda(X) (Y \cdot v),$$

and so $Y \cdot v \in V_{\lambda}$.

Step 5: Finish up the proof by finding a common eigenvector.

Write $\mathfrak{g} = \mathfrak{h} + L$ where L is a one-dimensional vector subspace. Since the base field is algebraically closed, there exists an eigenvector in $V_{\lambda}$ for some (thus every) nonzero element of L. Since that vector is also eigenvector for each element of $\mathfrak{h}$, the proof is complete. $\square$

== Consequences ==
The theorem applies in particular to the adjoint representation $\operatorname{ad}: \mathfrak{g} \to \mathfrak{gl}(\mathfrak{g})$ of a (finite-dimensional) solvable Lie algebra $\mathfrak{g}$ over an algebraically closed field of characteristic zero; thus, one can choose a basis on $\mathfrak{g}$ with respect to which $\operatorname{ad}(\mathfrak{g})$ consists of upper triangular matrices. It follows easily that for each $x, y \in \mathfrak{g}$, $\operatorname{ad}([x, y]) = [\operatorname{ad}(x), \operatorname{ad}(y)]$ has diagonal consisting of zeros; i.e., $\operatorname{ad}([x, y])$ is a strictly upper triangular matrix. This implies that $[\mathfrak g, \mathfrak g]$ is a nilpotent Lie algebra. Moreover, if the base field is not algebraically closed then solvability and nilpotency of a Lie algebra is unaffected by extending the base field to its algebraic closure. Hence, one concludes the statement (the other implication is obvious):

A finite-dimensional Lie algebra $\mathfrak g$ over a field of characteristic zero is solvable if and only if the derived algebra $D \mathfrak g = [\mathfrak g, \mathfrak g]$ is nilpotent.

Lie's theorem also establishes one direction in Cartan's criterion for solvability:

If V is a finite-dimensional vector space over a field of characteristic zero and $\mathfrak{g} \subseteq \mathfrak{gl}(V)$ a Lie subalgebra, then $\mathfrak{g}$ is solvable if and only if $\operatorname{tr}(XY) = 0$ for every $X \in \mathfrak{g}$ and $Y \in [\mathfrak{g}, \mathfrak{g}]$.

Indeed, as above, after extending the base field, the implication $\Rightarrow$ is seen easily. (The converse is more difficult to prove.)

Lie's theorem (for various V) is equivalent to the statement:

For a solvable Lie algebra $\mathfrak g$ over an algebraically closed field of characteristic zero, each finite-dimensional simple $\mathfrak{g}$-module (i.e., irreducible as a representation) has dimension one.

Indeed, Lie's theorem clearly implies this statement. Conversely, assume the statement is true. Given a finite-dimensional $\mathfrak g$-module V, let $V_1$ be a maximal $\mathfrak g$-submodule (which exists by finiteness of the dimension). Then, by maximality, $V/V_1$ is simple; thus, is one-dimensional. The induction now finishes the proof.

The statement says in particular that a finite-dimensional simple module over an abelian Lie algebra is one-dimensional; this fact remains true over any base field since in this case every vector subspace is a Lie subalgebra.

Here is another quite useful application:

Let $\mathfrak{g}$ be a finite-dimensional Lie algebra over an algebraically closed field of characteristic zero with radical $\operatorname{rad}(\mathfrak{g})$. Then each finite-dimensional simple representation $\pi: \mathfrak{g} \to \mathfrak{gl}(V)$ is the tensor product of a simple representation of $\mathfrak{g}/\operatorname{rad}(\mathfrak{g})$ with a one-dimensional representation of $\mathfrak{g}$ (i.e., a linear functional vanishing on Lie brackets).

By Lie's theorem, we can find a linear functional $\lambda$ of $\operatorname{rad}(\mathfrak{g})$ so that there is the weight space $V_{\lambda}$ of $\operatorname{rad}(\mathfrak{g})$. By Step 4 of the proof of Lie's theorem, $V_{\lambda}$ is also a $\mathfrak{g}$-module; so $V = V_{\lambda}$. In particular, for each $X \in \operatorname{rad}(\mathfrak{g})$, $\operatorname{tr}(\pi(X)) = \dim(V) \lambda(X)$. Extend $\lambda$ to a linear functional on $\mathfrak{g}$ that vanishes on $[\mathfrak g, \mathfrak g]$; $\lambda$ is then a one-dimensional representation of $\mathfrak{g}$. Now, $(\pi, V) \simeq (\pi, V) \otimes (-\lambda) \otimes \lambda$. Since $\pi$ coincides with $\lambda$ on $\operatorname{rad}(\mathfrak{g})$, we have that $V \otimes (-\lambda)$ is trivial on $\operatorname{rad}(\mathfrak{g})$ and thus is the restriction of a (simple) representation of $\mathfrak{g}/\operatorname{rad}(\mathfrak{g})$. $\square$

== See also ==
- Engel's theorem, which concerns a nilpotent Lie algebra.
- Lie–Kolchin theorem, which is about a (connected) solvable linear algebraic group.

== Sources ==
- Fulton, William; Harris, Joe (1991). Representation theory. A first course. Graduate Texts in Mathematics, Readings in Mathematics. Vol. 129. New York: Springer-Verlag. doi:10.1007/978-1-4612-0979-9. ISBN 978-0-387-97495-8. MR 1153249. OCLC 246650103.
- Humphreys, James E. (1972), Introduction to Lie Algebras and Representation Theory, Berlin, New York: Springer-Verlag, ISBN 978-0-387-90053-7.
- Jacobson, Nathan (1979), Lie algebras (Republication of the 1962 original ed.), New York: Dover Publications, Inc., ISBN 0-486-63832-4, MR 0559927
- Serre, Jean-Pierre (2001), Complex Semisimple Lie Algebras, Springer Monographs in Mathematics, Berlin: Springer, doi:10.1007/978-3-642-56884-8, ISBN 3-5406-7827-1, MR 1808366
