= Parabolic Lie algebra =

In algebra, a parabolic Lie algebra $\mathfrak p$ is a subalgebra of a semisimple Lie algebra $\mathfrak g$ satisfying one of the following two conditions:

- $\mathfrak p$ contains a maximal solvable subalgebra (a Borel subalgebra) of $\mathfrak g$;
- the orthogonal complement with respect to the Killing form of $\mathfrak p$ in $\mathfrak g$ is isomorphic to the nilradical of $\mathfrak p$.

These conditions are equivalent over an algebraically closed field of characteristic zero, such as the complex numbers. If the field $\mathbb F$ is not algebraically closed, then the first condition is replaced by the assumption that

- $\mathfrak p\otimes_{\mathbb F}\overline{\mathbb F}$ contains a Borel subalgebra of $\mathfrak g\otimes_{\mathbb F}\overline{\mathbb F}$

where $\overline{\mathbb F}$ is the algebraic closure of $\mathbb F$.

== Examples ==
For the general linear Lie algebra $\mathfrak{g}=\mathfrak{gl}_n(\mathbb F)$, a parabolic subalgebra is the stabilizer of a partial flag of $\mathbb F^n$, i.e. a sequence of nested linear subspaces. For a complete flag, the stabilizer gives a Borel subalgebra. For a single linear subspace $\mathbb F^k\subset \mathbb F^n$, one gets a maximal parabolic subalgebra $\mathfrak p$, and the space of possible choices is the Grassmannian $\mathrm{Gr}(k,n)$.

In general, for a complex simple Lie algebra $\mathfrak g$, parabolic subalgebras are in bijection with subsets of simple roots, i.e. subsets of the nodes of the Dynkin diagram.

== See also ==
- Generalized flag variety
- Parabolic subgroup of a reflection group

== Bibliography ==
- Baston, Robert J.; Eastwood, Michael G. (2016) [1989], The Penrose Transform: its Interaction with Representation Theory, Dover, ISBN 9780486816623
- Fulton, William; Harris, Joe (1991). Representation theory. A first course. Graduate Texts in Mathematics, Readings in Mathematics. Vol. 129. New York: Springer-Verlag. doi:10.1007/978-1-4612-0979-9. ISBN 978-0-387-97495-8. MR 1153249. OCLC 246650103.
- Grothendieck, Alexander (1957), "Sur la classification des fibrés holomorphes sur la sphère de Riemann", Amer. J. Math., 79 (1): 121–138, doi:10.2307/2372388, JSTOR 2372388.
- Humphreys, J. (1972), Linear Algebraic Groups, Springer, ISBN 978-0-387-90108-4
