= Engel subalgebra =

In mathematics, an Engel subalgebra of a Lie algebra with respect to some element x is the subalgebra of elements annihilated by some power of ad x. Engel subalgebras are named after Friedrich Engel. For finite-dimensional Lie algebras over infinite fields the minimal Engel subalgebras are the Cartan subalgebras.

== See also ==
- Engel's theorem
