= Engel identity =

The Engel identity, named after Friedrich Engel, is a mathematical equation that is satisfied by all elements of a Lie ring, in the case of an Engel Lie ring, or by all the elements of a group, in the case of an Engel group. The Engel identity is the defining condition of an Engel group.

== Formal definition ==
A Lie ring $L$ is defined as a nonassociative ring with multiplication that is anticommutative and satisfies the Jacobi identity with respect to the Lie bracket $[x,y]$, defined for all elements $x,y$ in the ring $L$. The Lie ring $L$ is defined to be an n-Engel Lie ring if and only if

- for all $x, y$ in $L$, the n-Engel identity

$[x,[x, \ldots, [x,[x,y]]\ldots]] = 0$ (n copies of $x$), is satisfied.

In the case of a group $G$, in the preceding definition, use the definition [x,y] = x^{−1} • y^{−1} • x • y and replace $0$ by $1$, where $1$ is the identity element of the group $G$.

== See also ==
- Adjoint representation
- Efim Zelmanov
- Engel's theorem
