= Automorphism of a Lie algebra =

Type of automorphism

In abstract algebra, an automorphism of a Lie algebra $\mathfrak g$ is an isomorphism from $\mathfrak g$ to itself, that is, a bijective linear map preserving the Lie bracket. The automorphisms of $\mathfrak{g}$ form a group denoted $\operatorname{Aut} \mathfrak{g}$, the automorphism group of $\mathfrak{g}$.

== Inner and outer automorphisms ==
The subgroup of $\operatorname{Aut} \mathfrak{g}$ generated using the adjoint action $e^{\operatorname{ad}(x)}, x \in \mathfrak g$ is called the inner automorphism group of $\mathfrak g$. The group is denoted $\operatorname{Aut}^0(\mathfrak{g})$. These form a normal subgroup in the group of automorphisms, and the quotient $\operatorname{Aut}(\mathfrak{g})/\operatorname{Aut}^0(\mathfrak{g})$ is known as the outer automorphism group.

=== Diagram automorphisms ===
It is known that the outer automorphism group for a simple Lie algebra $\mathfrak{g}$ is isomorphic to the group of diagram automorphisms for the corresponding Dynkin diagram in the classification of Lie algebras. The only algebras with non-trivial outer automorphism group are therefore $A_n (n \geq 2)$, $D_n$ and $E_6$.

$\mathfrak g$	Outer automorphism group
$A_n, n \geq 2$	$\mathbb{Z}_2$
$D_n, n \neq 4$	$\mathbb{Z}_2$
$D_4$	$S_3$
$E_6$	$\mathbb{Z}_2$

There are ways to concretely realize these automorphisms in the matrix representations of these groups. For $A_n = \mathfrak{sl}(n+1, \mathbb{C})$, the automorphism can be realized as the negative transpose; this map is equivalent (by conjugating by an appropriate change-of-basis) to the one given on standard generators by sending $e_i$ to $e_{n+1-i}$ and $f_i$ to $f_{n+1-i}$. For $D_n = \mathfrak{so}(2n)$ where $n \neq 4$, the unique automorphism is obtained by conjugating by an orthogonal matrix in $O(2n)$ with determinant −1. For $D_4=\mathfrak{so}(8)$, the outer automorphism group is unique in that it is isomorphic to $S_3$. The presence of an order 3 automorphism gives rise to triality. These automorphisms do not have forms in terms of conjugation, except for one of the automorphisms of order 2.

== Derivations ==
A derivation on a Lie algebra is a linear map
$$\delta: \mathfrak{g} \rightarrow \mathfrak{g}$$
satisfying the Leibniz rule
$$\delta[X,Y] = [\delta X, Y] + [X, \delta Y].$$
The set of derivations on a Lie algebra $\mathfrak{g}$ is denoted $\operatorname{Der} \mathfrak{g}$, and is a subalgebra of the endomorphisms on $\mathfrak{g}$, that is $\operatorname{Der} \mathfrak{g} < \operatorname{End} \mathfrak{g}$. They inherit a Lie algebra structure from the Lie algebra structure on the endomorphism algebra, and closure of the bracket follows from the Leibniz rule.

Due to the Jacobi identity, it can be shown that the image of the adjoint representation $\operatorname{ad}: \mathfrak{g} \rightarrow \operatorname{End} \mathfrak{g}$ lies in $\operatorname{Der} \mathfrak{g}$.

Through the Lie group-Lie algebra correspondence, the Lie group of automorphisms $\operatorname{Aut} \mathfrak{g}$ corresponds to the Lie algebra of derivations $\operatorname{Der} \mathfrak{g}$.

For $\mathfrak{g}$ finite, all derivations are inner.

== Examples ==
- For each $g$ in a Lie group $G$, let $\operatorname{Ad}_g$ denote the differential at the identity of the conjugation by $g$. Then $\operatorname{Ad}_g$ is an automorphism of $\mathfrak{g} = \operatorname{Lie}(G)$, the adjoint action by $g$.

== Theorems ==
The Borel–Morozov theorem states that every solvable subalgebra of a complex semisimple Lie algebra $\mathfrak g$ can be mapped to a subalgebra of a Cartan subalgebra $\mathfrak h$ of $\mathfrak g$ by an inner automorphism of $\mathfrak g$. In particular, it says that $\mathfrak h \oplus \bigoplus_{\alpha > 0} \mathfrak{g}_{\alpha} =: \mathfrak{h} \oplus \mathfrak{g}^+$, where $\mathfrak{g}_{\alpha}$ are root spaces, is a maximal solvable subalgebra (that is, a Borel subalgebra).
