= Commuting matrices =

Mathematical concept in algebra

In linear algebra, two matrices $A$ and $B$ are said to commute if $AB=BA$, or equivalently if their commutator $[A,B]= AB-BA$ is zero. Matrices $A$ that commute with matrix $B$ are called the commutant of matrix $B$ (and vice versa).

A set of matrices $A_1, \ldots, A_k$ is said to commute if they commute pairwise, meaning that every pair of matrices in the set commutes.

== Characterizations and properties ==
- Commuting matrices preserve each other's eigenspaces. As a consequence, commuting matrices over an algebraically closed field are simultaneously triangularizable; that is, there are bases over which they are both upper triangular. In other words, if $A_1,\ldots,A_k$ commute, there exists a similarity matrix $P$ such that $P^{-1} A_i P$ is upper triangular for all $i \in \{1,\ldots,k\}$. The converse is not necessarily true, as the following counterexample shows:
  $$\begin{bmatrix} 1 & 2 \\ 0 & 3 \end{bmatrix}\begin{bmatrix} 1 & 1 \\ 0 & 1 \end{bmatrix} = \begin{bmatrix} 1 & 3 \\ 0 & 3 \end{bmatrix} \ne \begin{bmatrix} 1 & 5 \\ 0 & 3 \end{bmatrix}=\begin{bmatrix} 1 & 1 \\ 0 & 1 \end{bmatrix}\begin{bmatrix} 1 & 2 \\ 0 & 3 \end{bmatrix}.$$
- Let $n$ be either 2 or 3, and let $A$ and $B$ be $n$ by $n$ matrices over an algebraically closed field. If the square of the commutator of $A$ and $B$ is $0$, that is, $[A,B]^2 = 0$, then $A$ and $B$ are simultaneously triangularizable.
- Two diagonalizable matrices $A$ and $B$ commute ($AB=BA$) if they are simultaneously diagonalizable (that is, there exists an invertible matrix $P$ such that both $P^{-1} A P$ and $P^{-1}B P$ are diagonal). The converse is also true; that is, if two diagonalizable matrices commute, they are simultaneously diagonalizable. But if you take any two matrices that commute (and do not assume they are two diagonalizable matrices) they are simultaneously diagonalizable already if one of the matrices has no multiple eigenvalues.
- If $A$ and $B$ commute, they have a common eigenvector. If $A$ has distinct eigenvalues, and $A$ and $B$ commute, then $A$'s eigenvectors are $B$'s eigenvectors.
- If one of the matrices has the property that its minimal polynomial coincides with its characteristic polynomial (that is, it has the maximal degree), which happens in particular whenever the characteristic polynomial has only simple roots, then the other matrix can be written as a polynomial in the first.
- As a direct consequence of simultaneous triangulizability, the eigenvalues of two commuting complex matrices A, B with their algebraic multiplicities (the multisets of roots of their characteristic polynomials) can be matched up as $\alpha_i\leftrightarrow\beta_i$ in such a way that the multiset of eigenvalues of any polynomial $P(A,B)$ in the two matrices is the multiset of the values $P(\alpha_i,\beta_i)$. This theorem is due to Frobenius.
- Two Hermitian matrices commute if their eigenspaces coincide. In particular, two Hermitian matrices without multiple eigenvalues commute if they share the same set of eigenvectors. This follows by considering the eigenvalue decompositions of both matrices. Let $A$ and $B$ be two Hermitian matrices. $A$ and $B$ have common eigenspaces when they can be written as $A = U \Lambda_1 U^\dagger$ and $B = U \Lambda_2 U^\dagger$. It then follows that
  $$AB = U \Lambda_1 U^\dagger U \Lambda_2 U^\dagger = U \Lambda_1 \Lambda_2 U^\dagger = U \Lambda_2 \Lambda_1 U^\dagger = U \Lambda_2 U^\dagger U \Lambda_1 U^\dagger = BA.$$
- The property of two matrices commuting is not transitive: A matrix $A$ may commute with both $B$ and $C$, and still $B$ and $C$ do not commute with each other. As an example, the identity matrix commutes with all matrices, which between them do not all commute. If the set of matrices considered is restricted to Hermitian matrices without multiple eigenvalues, then commutativity is transitive, as a consequence of the characterization in terms of eigenvectors.
- Lie's theorem, which shows that any representation of a solvable Lie algebra is simultaneously upper triangularizable, may be viewed as a generalization.
- An n × n matrix $A$ commutes with every other n × n matrix if and only if it is a scalar matrix, that is, a matrix of the form $\lambda I$, where $I$ is the n × n identity matrix and $\lambda$ is a scalar. In other words, the center of the group of invertible n × n matrices under multiplication is the subgroup of scalar matrices.
- Fix a finite field $\mathbb F_q$, let $P(n)$ denote the number of ordered pairs of commuting $n\times n$ matrices over $\mathbb F_q$, W. Feit and N. J. Fine showed the equation
  $$1 + \sum_{n=1}^\infty \frac{P(n)}{(q^n-1)(q^n-q)\cdots (q^n-q^{n-1})} z^n =
\prod_{i=1}^\infty \prod_{j=0}^\infty \frac {1}{1 - q^{1-j} z^i}.$$

== Examples ==
- The identity matrix commutes with all matrices.
- Jordan blocks commute with upper triangular matrices that have the same value along bands.
- If the product of two symmetric matrices is symmetric, then they must commute. That also means that every diagonal matrix commutes with all other diagonal matrices.
- Circulant matrices commute. They form a commutative ring since the sum of two circulant matrices is circulant.

== History ==
The notion of commuting matrices was introduced by Cayley in his memoir on the theory of matrices, which also provided the first axiomatization of matrices. The first significant results on commuting matrices were proved by Frobenius in 1878. In 1969, Gelfand and Ponomarev showed that the problem of classification of pairs of commuting matrices is equivalent to the problem of classification on k-tuples of matrices modulo similarity, which does not have a reasonable solution.
