= Index of a Lie algebra =

In algebra, let g be a Lie algebra over a field K. Let further $\xi\in\mathfrak{g}^*$ be a one-form on g. The stabilizer g_{ξ} of ξ is the Lie subalgebra of elements of g that annihilate ξ in the coadjoint representation. The index of the Lie algebra is

$$\operatorname{ind}\mathfrak{g}:=\min\limits_{\xi\in\mathfrak{g}^*} \dim\mathfrak{g}_\xi.$$

== Examples ==
=== Reductive Lie algebras ===
If g is reductive then the index of g is also the rank of g, because the adjoint and coadjoint representation are isomorphic and rk g is the minimal dimension of a stabilizer of an element in g. This is actually the dimension of the stabilizer of any regular element in g.

=== Frobenius Lie algebra ===
If ind g = 0, then g is called Frobenius Lie algebra. This is equivalent to the fact that the Kirillov form $K_\xi\colon \mathfrak{g\otimes g}\to \mathbb{K}:(X,Y)\mapsto \xi([X,Y])$ is non-singular for some ξ in g^{*}. Another equivalent condition when g is the Lie algebra of an algebraic group G, is that g is Frobenius if and only if G has an open orbit in g^{*} under the coadjoint representation.

=== Lie algebra of an algebraic group ===
If g is the Lie algebra of an algebraic group G, then the index of g is the transcendence degree of the field of rational functions on g^{*} that are invariant under the (co)adjoint action of G.
