= Quadratic Lie algebra =

A quadratic Lie algebra is a Lie algebra together with a compatible symmetric bilinear form. Compatibility means that it is invariant under the adjoint representation. Examples of such are semisimple Lie algebras, such as su(n) and sl(n,R).

== Definition ==
A quadratic Lie algebra is a Lie algebra (g,[.,.]) together with a non-degenerate symmetric bilinear form $(.,.)\colon \mathfrak{g}\otimes\mathfrak{g}\to \mathbb{R}$ that is invariant under the adjoint action, i.e.

([X,Y],Z)+(Y,[X,Z])=0

where X,Y,Z are elements of the Lie algebra g. A localization/ generalization is the concept of Courant algebroid where the vector space g is replaced by (sections of) a vector bundle.

== Examples ==
As a first example, consider R^{n} with zero-bracket and standard inner product

$$((x_1,\dots,x_n),(y_1,\dots,y_n)):= \sum_j x_jy_j$$.

Since the bracket is trivial the invariance is trivially fulfilled.

As a more elaborate example consider so(3), i.e. R^{3} with base X,Y,Z, standard inner product, and Lie bracket

$$[X,Y]=Z,\quad [Y,Z]=X,\quad [Z,X]=Y$$.

Straightforward computation shows that the inner product is indeed preserved. A generalization is the following.

=== Semisimple Lie algebras ===
A big group of examples fits into the category of semisimple Lie algebras, i.e. Lie algebras whose adjoint representation is faithful. Examples are sl(n,R) and su(n), as well as direct sums of them. Let thus g be a semi-simple Lie algebra with adjoint representation ad, i.e.

$$\mathrm{ad}\colon\mathfrak{g}\to\mathrm{End}(\mathfrak{g}):X\mapsto (\mathrm{ad}_X\colon Y\mapsto [X,Y])$$.

Define now the Killing form

$$k\colon\mathfrak{g}\otimes\mathfrak{g}\to\mathbb{R}: X\otimes Y \mapsto -\mathrm{tr}(\mathrm{ad}_X\circ\mathrm{ad}_Y)$$.

Due to the Cartan criterion, the Killing form is non-degenerate if and only if the Lie algebra is semisimple.

If g is in addition a simple Lie algebra, then the Killing form is up to rescaling the only invariant symmetric bilinear form.
