= Engel group =

In mathematics, an element x of a Lie group or a Lie algebra is called an n-Engel element, named after Friedrich Engel, if it satisfies the n-Engel condition that the repeated commutator [...[[x,y],y], ..., y] with n copies of y is trivial (where [x, y] means xyx^{−1}y^{−1} or the Lie bracket). It is called an Engel element if it satisfies the Engel condition that it is n-Engel for some n.

A Lie group or Lie algebra is said to satisfy the Engel or n-Engel conditions if every element does. Such groups or algebras are called Engel groups, n-Engel groups, Engel algebras, and n-Engel algebras.

Every nilpotent group or Lie algebra is Engel. Engel's theorem states that every finite-dimensional Engel algebra is nilpotent. (Cohn 1955) gave examples of non-nilpotent Engel groups and algebras.

== Notes ==
- Cohn, P. M. (1955), "A non-nilpotent Lie ring satisfying the Engel condition and a non-nilpotent Engel group", Proc. Cambridge Philos. Soc., 51 (3): 401–405, Bibcode:1955PCPS...51..401C, doi:10.1017/S0305004100030395, MR 0071720
