= Dixmier mapping =

In mathematics, the Dixmier mapping describes the space Prim(U(g)) of primitive ideals of the universal enveloping algebra U(g) of a finite-dimensional solvable Lie algebra g over an algebraically closed field of characteristic 0 in terms of coadjoint orbits. More precisely, it is a homeomorphism from the space of orbits g^{*}/G of the dual g^{*} of g (with the Zariski topology) under the action of the adjoint group G to Prim(U(g)) (with the Jacobson topology). The Dixmier map is closely related to the orbit method, which relates the irreducible representations of a nilpotent Lie group to its coadjoint orbits. Dixmier (1963) introduced the Dixmier map for nilpotent Lie algebras and then in (Dixmier 1966) extended it to solvable ones. Dixmier (1996, chapter 6) describes the Dixmier mapping in detail.

== Construction ==
Suppose that g is a completely solvable Lie algebra, and f is an element of the dual g^{*}. A polarization of g at f is a subspace h of maximal dimension subject to the condition that f vanishes on [h,h], that is also a subalgebra. The Dixmier map I is defined by letting I(f) be the kernel of the twisted induced representation Ind^{~}(f|h,g) for a polarization h.
