= Nilradical =

Nilradical may refer to:

- Nilradical of a ring
- Nilradical of a Lie algebra
