= Cartan's criterion =

In mathematics, Cartan's criterion gives conditions for a Lie algebra in characteristic 0 to be solvable, which implies a related criterion for the Lie algebra to be semisimple. It is based on the notion of the Killing form, a symmetric bilinear form on $\mathfrak{g}$ defined by the formula

$$\kappa(u,v)=\operatorname{tr}(\operatorname{ad}(u)\operatorname{ad}(v)),$$

where tr denotes the trace of a linear operator. The criterion was introduced by Élie Cartan (1894).

== Cartan's criterion for solvability ==
Cartan's criterion for solvability states:

A Lie subalgebra $\mathfrak{g}$ of endomorphisms of a finite-dimensional vector space over a field of characteristic zero is solvable if and only if $\operatorname{tr}(ab)=0$ whenever $a\in\mathfrak{g},b\in[\mathfrak{g},\mathfrak{g}].$

The fact that $\operatorname{tr}(ab)=0$ in the solvable case follows from Lie's theorem that puts $\mathfrak g$ in the upper triangular form over the algebraic closure of the ground field (the trace can be computed after extending the ground field). The converse can be deduced from the nilpotency criterion based on the Jordan–Chevalley decomposition, as explained there.

Applying Cartan's criterion to the adjoint representation gives:

A finite-dimensional Lie algebra $\mathfrak{g}$ over a field of characteristic zero is solvable if and only if $\kappa(\mathfrak{g},[\mathfrak{g},\mathfrak{g}])=0$ (where $\kappa$ is the Killing form).

== Cartan's criterion for semisimplicity ==
Cartan's criterion for semisimplicity states:

A finite-dimensional Lie algebra $\mathfrak{g}$ over a field of characteristic zero is semisimple if and only if the Killing form is non-degenerate.

Jean Dieudonné (1953) gave a very short proof that if a finite-dimensional Lie algebra (in any characteristic) has a non-degenerate invariant bilinear form and no non-zero abelian ideals, and in particular if its Killing form is non-degenerate, then it is a sum of simple Lie algebras.

Conversely, it follows easily from Cartan's criterion for solvability that a semisimple algebra (in characteristic 0) has a non-degenerate Killing form.

== Examples ==
Cartan's criteria fail in characteristic $p>0$; for example:

- the Lie algebra $\mathfrak{sl}_p(k)$ is simple if k has characteristic not 2 and has vanishing Killing form, though it does have a nonzero invariant bilinear form given by $(a,b) = \operatorname{tr}(ab)$.
- the Lie algebra with basis $a_n$ for $n\in \Z/p\Z$ and bracket [a_{i},a_{j}] = (i−j)a_{i+j} is simple for $p>2$ but has no nonzero invariant bilinear form.
- If k has characteristic 2 then the semidirect product gl_{2}(k).k^{2} is a solvable Lie algebra, but the Killing form is not identically zero on its derived algebra sl_{2}(k).k^{2}.

If a finite-dimensional Lie algebra is nilpotent, then the Killing form is identically zero (and more generally the Killing form vanishes on any nilpotent ideal). The converse is false: there are non-nilpotent Lie algebras whose Killing form vanishes. An example is given by the semidirect product of an abelian Lie algebra V with a 1-dimensional Lie algebra acting on V as an endomorphism b such that b is not nilpotent and Tr(b^{2})=0.

In characteristic 0, every reductive Lie algebra (one that is a sum of abelian and simple Lie algebras) has a non-degenerate invariant symmetric bilinear form. However the converse is false: a Lie algebra with a non-degenerate invariant symmetric bilinear form need not be a sum of simple and abelian Lie algebras. A typical counterexample is G = L[t]/t^{n}L[t] where n>1, L is a simple complex Lie algebra with a bilinear form (,), and the bilinear form on G is given by taking the coefficient of t^{n−1} of the C[t]-valued bilinear form on G induced by the form on L. The bilinear form is non-degenerate, but the Lie algebra is not a sum of simple and abelian Lie algebras.

== See also ==
- Modular Lie algebra
