= Nilradical of a Lie algebra =

In algebra, the nilradical of a Lie algebra is a nilpotent ideal, which is as large as possible.

The nilradical $\mathfrak{nil}(\mathfrak g)$ of a finite-dimensional Lie algebra $\mathfrak{g}$ is its maximal nilpotent ideal, which exists because the sum of any two nilpotent ideals is nilpotent. It is an ideal in the radical $\mathfrak{rad}(\mathfrak{g})$ of the Lie algebra $\mathfrak{g}$. The quotient of a Lie algebra by its nilradical is a reductive Lie algebra $\mathfrak{g}^{\mathrm{red}}$. However, the corresponding short exact sequence

$$0 \to \mathfrak{nil}(\mathfrak g)\to \mathfrak g\to \mathfrak{g}^{\mathrm{red}}\to 0$$

does not split in general (i.e., there isn't always a subalgebra complementary to $\mathfrak{nil}(\mathfrak g)$ in $\mathfrak{g}$). This is in contrast to the Levi decomposition: the short exact sequence

$$0 \to \mathfrak{rad}(\mathfrak g)\to \mathfrak g\to \mathfrak{g}^{\mathrm{ss}}\to 0$$

does split (essentially because the quotient $\mathfrak{g}^{\mathrm{ss}}$ is semisimple).

== See also ==
- Levi decomposition
- Nilradical of a ring, a notion in ring theory.
