= Modular Lie algebra =

In mathematics, a modular Lie algebra is a Lie algebra over a field of positive characteristic.

The theory of modular Lie algebras is significantly different from the theory of real and complex Lie algebras. This difference can be traced to the properties of Frobenius automorphism and to the failure of the exponential map to establish a tight connection between properties of a modular Lie algebra and the corresponding algebraic group.

Although serious study of modular Lie algebras was initiated by Nathan Jacobson in 1950s, their representation theory in the semisimple case was advanced only recently due to the influential Lusztig conjectures, which have been partially proved.
