= Friedrich Engel (mathematician) =

German mathematician (1861–1941)

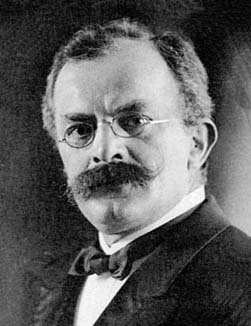
- Born: 26 December 1861; Lugau, Kingdom of Saxony, German Confederation
- Died: 29 September 1941 (aged 79); Giessen, Hessen, Nazi Germany
- Education: University of Leipzig; University of Berlin
- Known for: Engel distribution Engel expansion Engel group Engel identity Engel subalgebra Engel theorem
- Scientific career
- Fields: Mathematics
- Workplaces: University of Leipzig; University of Greifswald; University of Giessen
- Doctoral advisor: Christian Gustav Adolph Mayer
- Doctoral students: Abraham Plessner

Friedrich Engel (26 December 1861 – 29 September 1941) was a German mathematician.

Engel was born in Lugau, Saxony, as the son of a Lutheran pastor. He attended the Universities of both Leipzig and Berlin, before receiving his doctorate from Leipzig in 1883.

Engel studied under Felix Klein at Leipzig, and collaborated with Sophus Lie for much of his life. He worked at Leipzig (1885–1904), Greifswald (1904–1913), and Giessen (1913–1931). He died in Giessen.

Engel was the co-author, with Sophus Lie, of the three volume work Theorie der Transformationsgruppen (publ. 1888–1893; tr., "Theory of transformation groups"). Engel was the editor of the collected works of Sophus Lie with six volumes published between 1922 and 1937; the seventh and final volume was prepared for publication but appeared almost twenty years after Engel's death. He was also the editor of the collected works of Hermann Grassmann. Engel translated the works of Nikolai Lobachevski from Russian into German, thus making these works more accessible. With Paul Stäckel he wrote a history of non-Euclidean geometry (Theorie der Parallellinien von Euklid bis auf Gauss, 1895). With his former student Karl Faber, he wrote a book on the theory of partial differential equations of the first order using methods of Lie group theory. In 1910 Engel was the president of the Deutsche Mathematiker-Vereinigung.

== See also ==
- Engel group
- Engel expansion
- Engel's theorem
