= Levi decomposition =

Mathematical method to analyse Lie groups

- Field: Representation theory
- Conjectured by: Wilhelm Killing; Élie Cartan
- Conjectured in: 1888
- First proof by: Eugenio Elia Levi
- First proof in: 1905

In Lie theory and representation theory, the Levi decomposition, conjectured by Wilhelm Killing and Élie Cartan and proved by Eugenio Elia Levi (1905), states that any finite-dimensional Lie algebra g over a field of characteristic zero is the semidirect product of a solvable ideal and a semisimple subalgebra. One is its radical, a maximal solvable ideal, and the other is a semisimple subalgebra, called a Levi subalgebra.

When viewed as a factor-algebra of g, this semisimple Lie algebra is also called the Levi factor of g. To a certain extent, the decomposition can be used to reduce problems about finite-dimensional Lie algebras and Lie groups to separate problems about Lie algebras in these two special classes, solvable and semisimple.

Moreover, Malcev (1942) showed that any two Levi subalgebras are conjugate by an (inner) automorphism of the form

$$\exp(\mathrm{ad}(z))\$$

where z is in the nilradical (Levi–Malcev theorem).

An analogous result is valid for associative algebras and is called the Wedderburn principal theorem.

== Extensions of the results ==
In representation theory, Levi decomposition of parabolic subgroups of a reductive group is needed to construct a large family of the so-called parabolically induced representations. The Langlands decomposition is a slight refinement of the Levi decomposition for parabolic subgroups used in this context.

Analogous statements hold for simply connected Lie groups, and, as shown by George Mostow, for algebraic Lie algebras and simply connected algebraic groups over a field of characteristic zero.

There is no analogue of the Levi decomposition for most infinite-dimensional Lie algebras; for example affine Lie algebras have a radical consisting of their center, but cannot be written as a semidirect product of the center and another Lie algebra. The Levi decomposition also fails for finite-dimensional algebras over fields of positive characteristic.

== See also ==
- Lie group decompositions

== Bibliography ==
- Jacobson, Nathan (1979). Lie algebras. New York: Dover. ISBN 0486638324. OCLC 6499793.
- Levi, Eugenio Elia (1905), "Sulla struttura dei gruppi finiti e continui", Atti della Reale Accademia delle Scienze di Torino. (in Italian), XL: 551–565, JFM 36.0217.02, archived from the original on March 5, 2009 Reprinted in: Opere Vol. 1, Edizione Cremonese, Rome (1959), p. 101.
- Maltsev, Anatoly I. (1942), "On the representation of an algebra as a direct sum of the radical and a semi-simple subalgebra", C. R. (Doklady) Acad. Sci. URSS, New Series, 36: 42–45, MR 0007397, Zbl 0060.08004.
