= Radical of a Lie algebra =

In the mathematical field of Lie theory, the radical of a Lie algebra $\mathfrak{g}$ is the largest solvable ideal of $\mathfrak{g}.$

The radical, denoted by ${\rm rad}(\mathfrak{g})$, fits into the exact sequence

$$0 \to {\rm rad}(\mathfrak{g}) \to \mathfrak g \to \mathfrak{g}/{\rm rad}(\mathfrak{g}) \to 0$$.

where $\mathfrak{g}/{\rm rad}(\mathfrak{g})$ is semisimple. When the ground field has characteristic zero and $\mathfrak g$ has finite dimension, Levi's theorem states that this exact sequence splits; i.e., there exists a (necessarily semisimple) subalgebra of $\mathfrak g$ that is isomorphic to the semisimple quotient $\mathfrak{g}/{\rm rad}(\mathfrak{g})$ via the restriction of the quotient map $\mathfrak g \to \mathfrak{g}/{\rm rad}(\mathfrak{g}).$

A similar notion is a Borel subalgebra, which is a (not necessarily unique) maximal solvable subalgebra.

== Definition ==
Let $k$ be a field and let $\mathfrak{g}$ be a finite-dimensional Lie algebra over $k$. There exists a unique maximal solvable ideal, called the radical, for the following reason.

Firstly let $\mathfrak{a}$ and $\mathfrak{b}$ be two solvable ideals of $\mathfrak{g}$. Then $\mathfrak{a}+\mathfrak{b}$ is again an ideal of $\mathfrak{g}$, and it is solvable because it is an extension of $(\mathfrak{a}+\mathfrak{b})/\mathfrak{a}\simeq\mathfrak{b}/(\mathfrak{a}\cap\mathfrak{b})$ by $\mathfrak{a}$. Now consider the sum of all the solvable ideals of $\mathfrak{g}$. It is nonempty since $\{0\}$ is a solvable ideal, and it is a solvable ideal by the sum property just derived. Clearly it is the unique maximal solvable ideal.

== Related concepts ==
- A Lie algebra is semisimple if and only if its radical is $0$.
- A Lie algebra is reductive if and only if its radical equals its center.

== See also ==
- Levi decomposition
