= Reductive Lie algebra =

In mathematics, a Lie algebra is reductive if its adjoint representation is completely reducible, hence the name. More concretely, a Lie algebra is reductive if it is a direct sum of a semisimple Lie algebra and an abelian Lie algebra: $\mathfrak{g} = \mathfrak{s} \oplus \mathfrak{a};$ there are alternative characterizations, given below.

== Examples ==
The most basic example is the Lie algebra $\mathfrak{gl}_n$ of $n \times n$ matrices with the commutator as Lie bracket, or more abstractly as the endomorphism algebra of an n-dimensional vector space, $\mathfrak{gl}(V).$ This is the Lie algebra of the general linear group GL(n), and is reductive as it decomposes as $\mathfrak{gl}_n = \mathfrak{sl}_n \oplus \mathfrak{k},$ corresponding to traceless matrices and scalar matrices.

Any semisimple Lie algebra or abelian Lie algebra is a fortiori reductive.

Over the real numbers, compact Lie algebras are reductive.

== Definitions ==
A Lie algebra $\mathfrak{g}$ over a field of characteristic 0 is called reductive if any of the following equivalent conditions are satisfied:

1. The adjoint representation (the action by bracketing) of $\mathfrak{g}$ is completely reducible (a direct sum of irreducible representations).
2. $\mathfrak{g}$ admits a faithful, completely reducible, finite-dimensional representation.
3. The radical of $\mathfrak{g}$ equals the center: $\mathfrak{r}(\mathfrak{g}) = \mathfrak{z}(\mathfrak{g}).$
  The radical always contains the center, but need not equal it.
4. $\mathfrak{g}$ is the direct sum of a semisimple ideal $\mathfrak{s}_0$ and its center $\mathfrak{z}(\mathfrak{g}):$ $\mathfrak{g} = \mathfrak{s}_0 \oplus \mathfrak{z}(\mathfrak{g}).$
  Compare to the Levi decomposition, which decomposes a Lie algebra as its radical (which is solvable, not abelian in general) and a Levi subalgebra (which is semisimple).
5. $\mathfrak{g}$ is a direct sum of a semisimple Lie algebra $\mathfrak{s}$ and an abelian Lie algebra $\mathfrak{a}$: $\mathfrak{g} = \mathfrak{s} \oplus \mathfrak{a}.$
6. $\mathfrak{g}$ is a direct sum of prime ideals: $\mathfrak{g} = \textstyle{\sum \mathfrak{g}_i}.$

Some of these equivalences are easily seen. For example, the center and radical of $\mathfrak{s} \oplus \mathfrak{a}$ is $\mathfrak{a},$ while if the radical equals the center the Levi decomposition yields a decomposition $\mathfrak{g} = \mathfrak{s}_0 \oplus \mathfrak{z}(\mathfrak{g}).$ Further, simple Lie algebras and the trivial 1-dimensional Lie algebra $\mathfrak{k}$ are prime ideals.

== Properties ==
Reductive Lie algebras are a generalization of semisimple Lie algebras, and share many properties with them: many properties of semisimple Lie algebras depend only on the fact that they are reductive. Notably, the unitarian trick of Hermann Weyl works for reductive Lie algebras.

The associated reductive Lie groups are of significant interest: the Langlands program is based on the premise that what is done for one reductive Lie group should be done for all.

The intersection of reductive Lie algebras and solvable Lie algebras is exactly abelian Lie algebras (contrast with the intersection of semisimple and solvable Lie algebras being trivial).
