= Borel subalgebra =

In mathematics, specifically in representation theory, a Borel subalgebra of a Lie algebra $\mathfrak{g}$ is a maximal solvable subalgebra. The notion is named after Armand Borel.

If the Lie algebra $\mathfrak{g}$ is the Lie algebra of a complex Lie group, then a Borel subalgebra is the Lie algebra of a Borel subgroup.

== Borel subalgebra associated to a flag ==
Let $\mathfrak g = \mathfrak{gl}(V)$ be the Lie algebra of the endomorphisms of a finite-dimensional vector space V over the complex numbers. Then to specify a Borel subalgebra of $\mathfrak g$ amounts to specify a flag of V; given a flag $V = V_0 \supset V_1 \supset \cdots \supset V_n = 0$, the subspace $\mathfrak b = \{ x \in \mathfrak g \mid x(V_i) \subset V_i, 1 \le i \le n \}$ is a Borel subalgebra, and conversely, each Borel subalgebra is of that form by Lie's theorem. Hence, the Borel subalgebras are classified by the flag variety of V.

== Borel subalgebra relative to a base of a root system ==
Let $\mathfrak g$ be a complex semisimple Lie algebra, $\mathfrak h$ a Cartan subalgebra and R the root system associated to them. Choosing a base of R gives the notion of positive roots. Then $\mathfrak g$ has the decomposition $\mathfrak g = \mathfrak n^- \oplus \mathfrak h \oplus \mathfrak n^+$ where $\mathfrak n^{\pm} = \sum_{\alpha > 0} \mathfrak{g}_{\pm \alpha}$. Then $\mathfrak b = \mathfrak h \oplus \mathfrak n^+$ is the Borel subalgebra relative to the above setup. (It is solvable since the derived algebra $[\mathfrak b, \mathfrak b]$ is nilpotent. It is maximal solvable by a theorem of Borel–Morozov on the conjugacy of solvable subalgebras.)

Given a $\mathfrak g$-module V, a primitive element of V is a (nonzero) vector that (1) is a weight vector for $\mathfrak h$ and that (2) is annihilated by $\mathfrak{n}^+$. It is the same thing as a $\mathfrak b$-weight vector (Proof: if $h \in \mathfrak h$ and $e \in \mathfrak{n}^+$ with $[h, e] = 2e$ and if $\mathfrak{b} \cdot v$ is a line, then $0 = [h, e] \cdot v = 2 e \cdot v$.)

== See also ==
- Borel subgroup
- Parabolic Lie algebra
