= Engel's theorem =

Theorem in Lie representation theory

In representation theory, a branch of mathematics, Engel's theorem states that a finite-dimensional Lie algebra $\mathfrak g$ is a nilpotent Lie algebra if and only if for each $X \in \mathfrak g$, the adjoint map

$$\operatorname{ad}(X)\colon \mathfrak{g} \to \mathfrak{g},$$

given by $\operatorname{ad}(X)(Y) = [X, Y]$, is a nilpotent endomorphism on $\mathfrak{g}$; i.e., $\operatorname{ad}(X)^k = 0$ for some k. It is a consequence of the theorem, also called Engel's theorem, which says that if a Lie algebra of matrices consists of nilpotent matrices, then the matrices can all be simultaneously brought to a strictly upper triangular form. Note that if we merely have a Lie algebra of matrices which is nilpotent as a Lie algebra, then this conclusion does not follow (i.e. the naïve replacement in Lie's theorem of "solvable" with "nilpotent", and "upper triangular" with "strictly upper triangular", is false; this already fails for the one-dimensional Lie subalgebra of scalar matrices).

The theorem is named after the mathematician Friedrich Engel, who sketched a proof of it in a letter to Wilhelm Killing dated 20 July 1890 (Hawkins 2000, p. 176). Engel's student K.A. Umlauf gave a complete proof in his 1891 dissertation, reprinted as (Umlauf 2010).

== Statements ==
Let $\mathfrak{gl}(V)$ be the Lie algebra of the endomorphisms of a finite-dimensional vector space V and $\mathfrak g \subset \mathfrak{gl}(V)$ a subalgebra. Then Engel's theorem states the following are equivalent:

1. Each $X \in \mathfrak{g}$ is a nilpotent endomorphism on V.
2. There exists a flag $V = V_0 \supset V_1 \supset \cdots \supset V_n = 0, \, \operatorname{codim} V_i = i$ such that $\mathfrak g \cdot V_i \subset V_{i+1}$; i.e., the elements of $\mathfrak g$ are simultaneously strictly upper-triangularizable.

Note that no assumption on the underlying base field is required.

We note that Statement 2. for various $\mathfrak g$ and V is equivalent to the statement

- For each nonzero finite-dimensional vector space V and a subalgebra $\mathfrak g \subset \mathfrak{gl}(V)$, there exists a nonzero vector v in V such that $X(v) = 0$ for every $X \in \mathfrak g.$

This is the form of the theorem proven in #Proof. (This statement is trivially equivalent to Statement 2 since it allows one to inductively construct a flag with the required property.)

In general, a Lie algebra $\mathfrak g$ is said to be nilpotent if the lower central series of it vanishes in a finite step; i.e., for $C^0 \mathfrak g = \mathfrak g, C^i \mathfrak g = [\mathfrak g, C^{i-1} \mathfrak g]$ = (i+1)-th power of $\mathfrak g$, there is some k such that $C^k \mathfrak g = 0$. Then Engel's theorem implies the following theorem (also called Engel's theorem): when $\mathfrak g$ has finite dimension,

- $\mathfrak g$ is nilpotent if and only if $\operatorname{ad}(X)$ is nilpotent for each $X \in \mathfrak g$.

Indeed, if $\operatorname{ad}(\mathfrak g)$ consists of nilpotent operators, then by 1. $\Leftrightarrow$ 2. applied to the algebra $\operatorname{ad}(\mathfrak g) \subset \mathfrak{gl}(\mathfrak g)$, there exists a flag $\mathfrak g = \mathfrak{g}_0 \supset \mathfrak{g}_1 \supset \cdots \supset \mathfrak{g}_n = 0$ such that $[\mathfrak g, \mathfrak g_i] \subset \mathfrak g_{i+1}$. Since $C^i \mathfrak g\subset \mathfrak g_i$, this implies $\mathfrak g$ is nilpotent. (The converse follows straightforwardly from the definition.)

== Proof ==
We prove the following form of the theorem: if $\mathfrak{g} \subset \mathfrak{gl}(V)$ is a Lie subalgebra such that every $X \in \mathfrak{g}$ is a nilpotent endomorphism and if V has positive dimension, then there exists a nonzero vector v in V such that $X(v) = 0$ for each X in $\mathfrak{g}$.

The proof is by induction on the dimension of $\mathfrak{g}$ and consists of a few steps. (Note the structure of the proof is very similar to that for Lie's theorem, which concerns a solvable algebra.) The basic case is trivial and we assume the dimension of $\mathfrak{g}$ is positive.

Step 1: Find an ideal $\mathfrak{h}$ of codimension one in $\mathfrak{g}$.

This is the most difficult step. Let $\mathfrak{h}$ be a maximal (proper) subalgebra of $\mathfrak{g}$, which exists by finite-dimensionality. We claim it is an ideal of codimension one. For each $X \in \mathfrak h$, it is easy to check that (1) $\operatorname{ad}(X)$ induces a linear endomorphism $\mathfrak{g}/\mathfrak{h} \to \mathfrak{g}/\mathfrak{h}$ and (2) this induced map is nilpotent (in fact, $\operatorname{ad}(X)$ is nilpotent as $X$ is nilpotent; see Jordan decomposition in Lie algebras). Thus, by inductive hypothesis applied to the Lie subalgebra of $\mathfrak{gl}(\mathfrak{g}/\mathfrak{h})$ generated by $\operatorname{ad}(\mathfrak{h})$, there exists a nonzero vector v in $\mathfrak{g}/\mathfrak{h}$ such that $\operatorname{ad}(X)(v) = 0$ for each $X \in \mathfrak{h}$. That is to say, if $v = [Y]$ for some Y in $\mathfrak{g}$ but not in $\mathfrak h$, then $[X, Y] = \operatorname{ad}(X)(Y) \in \mathfrak{h}$ for every $X \in \mathfrak{h}$. But then the subspace $\mathfrak{h}' \subset \mathfrak{g}$ spanned by $\mathfrak{h}$ and Y is a Lie subalgebra in which $\mathfrak{h}$ is an ideal of codimension one. Hence, by maximality, $\mathfrak{h}' = \mathfrak g$. This proves the claim.

Step 2: Let $W = \{ v \in V | X(v) = 0, X \in \mathfrak{h} \}$. Then $\mathfrak{g}$ stabilizes W; i.e., $X (v) \in W$ for each $X \in \mathfrak{g}, v \in W$.

Indeed, for $Y$ in $\mathfrak{g}$ and $X$ in $\mathfrak{h}$, we have: $X(Y(v)) = Y(X(v)) + [X, Y](v) = 0$ since $\mathfrak{h}$ is an ideal and so $[X, Y] \in \mathfrak{h}$. Thus, $Y(v)$ is in W.

Step 3: Finish up the proof by finding a nonzero vector that gets killed by $\mathfrak{g}$.

Write $\mathfrak{g} = \mathfrak{h} + L$ where L is a one-dimensional vector subspace. Let Y be a nonzero vector in L and v a nonzero vector in W. Now, $Y$ is a nilpotent endomorphism (by hypothesis) and so $Y^k(v) \ne 0, Y^{k+1}(v) = 0$ for some k. Then $Y^k(v)$ is a required vector as the vector lies in W by Step 2. $\square$

== Generalizations ==
- Zel'manov proved a generalization of Engel's theorem for Lie algebras of arbitrary dimension, including infinite-dimensional Lie algebras. Any $n$-Engel Lie algebra $\mathfrak{g}$ (that is, a Lie algebra $\mathfrak{g}$ such that $(\operatorname{ad}(X))^n=0$ for all $X\in \mathfrak{g}$) over a field $F$ of characteristic 0 is nilpotent.
- David J. Winter proved a generalization of Engel's theorem in the setting of graded Lie algebras. If $\mathfrak{g}=\bigoplus_{i\in A}\mathfrak{g}_i$ is a graded Lie algebra over a field $F$ of characteristic 0, where $A$ is a torsion-free abelian group with identity $0$, and if $\operatorname{ad}(\mathfrak{g}_0)$ consists of nilpotent endomorphisms, then $\mathfrak{g}$ is nilpotent. Here, $\mathfrak{g}_0$ is the homogeneous component corresponding to $0\in A$. This result generalizes Engel's theorem by requiring nilpotence of the adjoint endomorphisms only for elements in $\mathfrak{g}_0$, rather than all elements of $\mathfrak{g}$.

== See also ==
- Lie's theorem
- Heisenberg group

== Works cited ==
- Erdmann, Karin; Wildon, Mark (2006). Introduction to Lie Algebras (1st ed.). Springer. ISBN 1-84628-040-0.
- Fulton, William; Harris, Joe (1991). Representation theory. A first course. Graduate Texts in Mathematics, Readings in Mathematics. Vol. 129. New York: Springer-Verlag. doi:10.1007/978-1-4612-0979-9. ISBN 978-0-387-97495-8. MR 1153249. OCLC 246650103.
- Hawkins, Thomas (2000), Emergence of the theory of Lie groups, Sources and Studies in the History of Mathematics and Physical Sciences, Berlin, New York: Springer-Verlag, ISBN 978-0-387-98963-1, MR 1771134
- Hochschild, G. (1965). The Structure of Lie Groups. Holden Day.
- Humphreys, J. (1972). Introduction to Lie Algebras and Representation Theory. Springer.
- Umlauf, Karl Arthur (2010) [First published 1891], Über Die Zusammensetzung Der Endlichen Continuierlichen Transformationsgruppen, Insbesondre Der Gruppen Vom Range Null, Inaugural-Dissertation, Leipzig (in German), Nabu Press, ISBN 978-1-141-58889-3
