= Solvable Lie algebra =

In mathematics, a type of algebra

In mathematics, a Lie algebra $\mathfrak{g}$ is solvable if its derived series terminates in the zero subalgebra. The derived Lie algebra of the Lie algebra $\mathfrak{g}$ is the subalgebra of $\mathfrak{g}$, denoted

$$[\mathfrak{g},\mathfrak{g}]$$

that consists of all linear combinations of Lie brackets of pairs of elements of $\mathfrak{g}$. The derived series is the sequence of subalgebras

$$\mathfrak{g} \supseteq [\mathfrak{g},\mathfrak{g}] \supseteq [[\mathfrak{g},\mathfrak{g}],[\mathfrak{g},\mathfrak{g}]] \supseteq [[[\mathfrak{g},\mathfrak{g}],[\mathfrak{g},\mathfrak{g}]],[[\mathfrak{g},\mathfrak{g}],[\mathfrak{g},\mathfrak{g}]]]  \supseteq ...$$

If the derived series eventually arrives at the zero subalgebra, then the Lie algebra is called solvable. The derived series for Lie algebras is analogous to the derived series for commutator subgroups in group theory, and solvable Lie algebras are analogs of solvable groups.

Any nilpotent Lie algebra is a fortiori solvable but the converse is not true. The solvable Lie algebras and the semisimple Lie algebras form two large and generally complementary classes, as is shown by the Levi decomposition. The solvable Lie algebras are precisely those that can be obtained from semidirect products, starting from 0 and adding one dimension at a time.

A maximal solvable subalgebra is called a Borel subalgebra. The largest solvable ideal of a Lie algebra is called the radical.

== Characterizations ==
Let $\mathfrak{g}$ be a finite-dimensional Lie algebra over a field of characteristic 0. The following are equivalent.

- (i) $\mathfrak{g}$ is solvable.
- (ii) ${\rm ad}(\mathfrak{g})$, the adjoint representation of $\mathfrak{g}$, is solvable.
- (iii) There is a finite sequence of ideals $\mathfrak{a}_i$ of $\mathfrak{g}$:
  $$\mathfrak{g} = \mathfrak{a}_0 \supset \mathfrak{a}_1 \supset ... \mathfrak{a}_r = 0, \quad [\mathfrak{a}_i, \mathfrak{a}_i] \subset \mathfrak{a}_{i+1} \,\, \forall i .$$
- (iv) $[\mathfrak{g}, \mathfrak{g}]$ is nilpotent.
- (v) For $\mathfrak{g}$ $n$-dimensional, there is a finite sequence of subalgebras $\mathfrak{a}_i$ of $\mathfrak{g}$:
  $$\mathfrak{g} = \mathfrak{a}_0 \supset \mathfrak{a}_1 \supset ... \mathfrak{a}_n = 0, \quad  \operatorname{dim} \mathfrak{a}_{i}/\mathfrak{a}_{i + 1} = 1 \,\, \forall i,$$

with each $\mathfrak{a}_{i+1}$ an ideal in $\mathfrak{a}_i$. A sequence of this type is called an elementary sequence.

- (vi) There is a finite sequence of subalgebras $\mathfrak{g}_i$ of $\mathfrak{g}$,
  $$\mathfrak{g} = \mathfrak{g}_0 \supset \mathfrak{g}_1 \supset ... \mathfrak{g}_r = 0,$$

such that $\mathfrak{g}_{i+1}$ is an ideal in $\mathfrak{g}_i$ and $\mathfrak{g}_i/\mathfrak{g}_{i+1}$ is abelian.

- (vii) The Killing form $B$ of $\mathfrak{g}$ satisfies $B(X,Y)=0$ for all X in $\mathfrak{g}$ and Y in $[\mathfrak{g}, \mathfrak{g}]$. This is Cartan's criterion for solvability.

== Properties ==
Lie's Theorem states that if $V$ is a finite-dimensional vector space over an algebraically closed field of characteristic zero, and $\mathfrak{g}$ is a solvable Lie algebra, and if $\pi$ is a representation of $\mathfrak{g}$ over $V$, then there exists a simultaneous eigenvector $v \in V$ of the endomorphisms $\pi(X)$ for all elements $X \in \mathfrak{g}$.

- Every Lie subalgebra and quotient of a solvable Lie algebra are solvable.
- Given a Lie algebra $\mathfrak g$ and an ideal $\mathfrak h$ in it,
  $\mathfrak{g}$ is solvable if and only if both $\mathfrak h$ and $\mathfrak{g}/\mathfrak h$ are solvable.

The analogous statement is true for nilpotent Lie algebras provided $\mathfrak h$ is contained in the center. Thus, an extension of a solvable algebra by a solvable algebra is solvable, while a central extension of a nilpotent algebra by a nilpotent algebra is nilpotent.

- A solvable nonzero Lie algebra has a nonzero abelian ideal, the last nonzero term in the derived series.
- If $\mathfrak{a}, \mathfrak{b} \sub \mathfrak{g}$ are solvable ideals, then so is $\mathfrak{a} + \mathfrak{b}$. Consequently, if $\mathfrak{g}$ is finite-dimensional, then there is a unique solvable ideal $\mathfrak{r} \sub \mathfrak{g}$ containing all solvable ideals in $\mathfrak{g}$. This ideal is the radical of $\mathfrak{g}$.
- A solvable Lie algebra $\mathfrak{g}$ has a unique largest nilpotent ideal $\mathfrak{n}$, called the nilradical, the set of all $X \in \mathfrak{g}$ such that ${\rm ad}_X$ is nilpotent. If D is any derivation of $\mathfrak{g}$, then $D(\mathfrak{g}) \sub \mathfrak{n}$.

== Completely solvable Lie algebras ==
A Lie algebra $\mathfrak{g}$ is called completely solvable or split solvable if it has an elementary sequence of ideals in $\mathfrak{g}$ from $0$ to $\mathfrak{g}$. A finite-dimensional nilpotent Lie algebra is completely solvable, and a completely solvable Lie algebra is solvable. Over an algebraically closed field a solvable Lie algebra is completely solvable, but the $3$-dimensional real Lie algebra of the group of Euclidean isometries of the plane is solvable but not completely solvable.

A solvable Lie algebra $\mathfrak{g}$ is split solvable if and only if the eigenvalues of ${\rm ad}_X$ are in $k$ for all $X$ in $\mathfrak{g}$.

== Examples ==
=== Abelian Lie algebras ===
Every abelian Lie algebra $\mathfrak{a}$ is solvable by definition, since its commutator $[\mathfrak{a},\mathfrak{a}] = 0$. This includes the Lie algebra of diagonal matrices in $\mathfrak{gl}(n)$, which are of the form

$$\left\{ \begin{bmatrix}
* & 0 & 0 \\
0 & * & 0 \\
0 & 0 & *
\end{bmatrix} \right\}$$

for $n = 3$. The Lie algebra structure on a vector space $V$ given by the trivial bracket $[m,n] = 0$ for any two matrices $m,n \in \text{End}(V)$ gives another example.

=== Nilpotent Lie algebras ===
Another class of examples comes from nilpotent Lie algebras since the adjoint representation is solvable. Some examples include the upper-diagonal matrices, such as the class of matrices of the form

$$\left\{ \begin{bmatrix}
0 & * & * \\
0 & 0 & * \\
0 & 0 & 0
\end{bmatrix} \right\}$$

called the Lie algebra of strictly upper triangular matrices. In addition, the Lie algebra of upper diagonal matrices in $\mathfrak{gl}(n)$ form a solvable Lie algebra. This includes matrices of the form

$$\left\{ \begin{bmatrix}
* & * & * \\
0 & * & * \\
0 & 0 & *
\end{bmatrix} \right\}$$

and is denoted $\mathfrak{b}_k$.

=== Solvable but not split-solvable ===
Let $\mathfrak{g}$ be the set of matrices on the form

$$X = \left(\begin{matrix}0 & \theta & x\\ -\theta & 0 & y\\ 0 & 0 & 0\end{matrix}\right), \quad \theta, x, y \in \mathbb{R}.$$

Then $\mathfrak{g}$ is solvable, but not split solvable. It is isomorphic with the Lie algebra of the group of translations and rotations in the plane.

=== Non-example ===
A semisimple Lie algebra $\mathfrak{l}$ is never solvable since its radical $\text{Rad}(\mathfrak{l})$, which is the largest solvable ideal in $\mathfrak{l}$, is trivial. ^{page 11}

== Solvable Lie groups ==
Because the term "solvable" is also used for solvable groups in group theory, there are several possible definitions of solvable Lie group. For a Lie group $G$, there is

- termination of the usual derived series of the group $G$ (as an abstract group);
- termination of the closures of the derived series;
- having a solvable Lie algebra

== See also ==
- Cartan's criterion
- Killing form
- Lie–Kolchin theorem
- Solvmanifold
- Dixmier mapping
