= Semisimple element =

In mathematics, a semisimple element is an abstract element of an algebraic structure that generalizes a diagonalizable matrix. A precise meaning depends on context:

- A semisimple element in the endomorphism ring of a vector space is a semisimple operator.
- In a semisimple Lie algebra, an element is semisimple if its image under the adjoint representation is semisimple; see Semisimple Lie algebra#Jordan decomposition.
