= Lie algebra cohomology =

Cohomology theory for Lie algebras

In mathematics, Lie algebra cohomology is a cohomology theory for Lie algebras. It was first introduced in 1929 by Élie Cartan to study the topology of Lie groups and homogeneous spaces by relating cohomological methods of Georges de Rham to properties of the Lie algebra. It was later extended by Claude Chevalley and Samuel Eilenberg (1948) to coefficients in an arbitrary Lie module.

== Motivation ==
If $G$ is a compact simply connected Lie group, then it is determined by its Lie algebra, so it should be possible to calculate its cohomology from the Lie algebra. This can be done as follows. Its cohomology is the de Rham cohomology of the complex of differential forms on $G$. Using an averaging process, this complex can be replaced by the complex of left-invariant differential forms. The left-invariant forms, meanwhile, are determined by their values at the identity, so that the space of left-invariant differential forms can be identified with the exterior algebra of the Lie algebra, with a suitable differential.

The construction of this differential on an exterior algebra makes sense for any Lie algebra, so it is used to define Lie algebra cohomology for all Lie algebras. More generally one uses a similar construction to define Lie algebra cohomology with coefficients in a module.

If $G$ is a simply connected noncompact Lie group, the Lie algebra cohomology of the associated Lie algebra $\mathfrak g$ does not necessarily reproduce the de Rham cohomology of $G$. The reason for this is that the passage from the complex of all differential forms to the complex of left-invariant differential forms uses an averaging process that only makes sense for compact groups.

== Definition ==
Let $\mathfrak g$ be a Lie algebra over a commutative ring R with universal enveloping algebra $U\mathfrak g$, and let M be a representation of $\mathfrak g$ (equivalently, a $U\mathfrak g$-module). Considering R as a trivial representation of $\mathfrak g$, one defines the cohomology groups

$$\mathrm{H}^n(\mathfrak{g}; M) := \mathrm{Ext}^n_{U\mathfrak{g}}(R, M)$$

(see Ext functor for the definition of Ext). Equivalently, these are the right derived functors of the left exact invariant submodule functor

$$M \mapsto M^{\mathfrak{g}} := \{ m \in M \mid xm = 0\ \text{ for all } x \in \mathfrak{g}\}.$$

Analogously, one can define Lie algebra homology as

$$\mathrm{H}_n(\mathfrak{g}; M) := \mathrm{Tor}_n^{U\mathfrak{g}}(R, M)$$

(see Tor functor for the definition of Tor), which is equivalent to the left derived functors of the right exact coinvariants functor

$$M \mapsto M_{\mathfrak{g}} := M / \mathfrak{g} M.$$

Some important basic results about the cohomology of Lie algebras include Whitehead's lemmas, Weyl's theorem, and the Levi decomposition theorem.

== Chevalley–Eilenberg complex ==
Let $\mathfrak{g}$ be a Lie algebra over a field $k$, with a left action on the $\mathfrak{g}$-module $M$. The elements of the Chevalley–Eilenberg complex

$$\mathrm{Hom}_k(\Lambda^\bullet\mathfrak{g},M)$$

are called cochains from $\mathfrak{g}$ to $M$. A homogeneous $n$-cochain from $\mathfrak{g}$ to $M$ is thus an alternating $k$-multilinear function $f\colon\Lambda^n\mathfrak{g}\to M$. When $\mathfrak{g}$ is finitely generated as vector space, the Chevalley–Eilenberg complex is canonically isomorphic to the tensor product $M \otimes \Lambda^{\bullet}\mathfrak{g}^*$, where $\mathfrak{g}^*$denotes the dual vector space of $\mathfrak{g}$.

The Lie bracket $[\cdot,\cdot]\colon \Lambda^2 \mathfrak{g} \rightarrow \mathfrak{g}$ on $\mathfrak{g}$ induces a transpose application $d^{(1)}_{\mathfrak{g}} \colon \mathfrak{g}^* \rightarrow \Lambda^2 \mathfrak{g}^*$ by duality. The latter is sufficient to define a derivation $d_{\mathfrak{g}}$ of the complex of cochains from $\mathfrak{g}$ to $k$ by extending $d_{\mathfrak{g}}^{(1)}$according to the graded Leibniz rule. It follows from the Jacobi identity that $d_{\mathfrak{g}}$ satisfies $d_{\mathfrak{g}}^2 = 0$ and is in fact a differential. In this setting, $k$ is viewed as a trivial $\mathfrak{g}$-module while $k \sim \Lambda^0\mathfrak{g}^* \subseteq \mathrm{Ker}(d_{\mathfrak{g}})$ may be thought of as constants.

In general, let $\gamma \in \mathrm{Hom}(\mathfrak{g}, \operatorname{End} M)$ denote the left action of $\mathfrak{g}$ on $M$ and regard it as an application $d_\gamma^{(0)} \colon M \rightarrow M \otimes \mathfrak{g}^*$. The Chevalley–Eilenberg differential $d$ is then the unique derivation extending $d_\gamma^{(0)}$ and $d_{\mathfrak{g}}^{(1)}$ according to the graded Leibniz rule, the nilpotency condition $d^2 = 0$ following from the Lie algebra homomorphism from $\mathfrak{g}$ to $\operatorname{End} M$ and the Jacobi identity in $\mathfrak{g}$.

Explicitly, the differential of the $n$-cochain $f$ is the $(n+1)$-cochain $df$ given by:

$$\begin{align}
(d f)\left(x_1, \ldots, x_{n+1}\right) =
&\sum_i     (-1)^{i+1}x_i\, f\left(x_1, \ldots, \hat x_i, \ldots, x_{n+1}\right) + \\
&\sum_{i<j} (-1)^{i+j}      f\left(\left[x_i, x_j\right], x_1, \ldots, \hat x_i, \ldots, \hat x_j, \ldots, x_{n+1}\right)\, ,
\end{align}$$

where the caret signifies omitting that argument.

When $G$ is a real Lie group with Lie algebra $\mathfrak{g}$, the Chevalley–Eilenberg complex may also be canonically identified with the space of left-invariant forms with values in $M$, denoted by $\Omega^{\bullet}(G,M)^G$. The Chevalley–Eilenberg differential may then be thought of as a restriction of the covariant derivative on the trivial fiber bundle $G \times M \rightarrow G$, equipped with the equivariant connection $\tilde{\gamma} \in \Omega^1(G, \operatorname{End} M)$ associated with the left action $\gamma \in \mathrm{Hom}(\mathfrak{g}, \operatorname{End} M)$ of $\mathfrak{g}$ on $M$. In the particular case where $M = k = \mathbb{R}$ is equipped with the trivial action of $\mathfrak{g}$, the Chevalley–Eilenberg differential coincides with the restriction of the de Rham differential on $\Omega^{\bullet}(G)$ to the subspace of left-invariant differential forms.

== Cohomology in small dimensions ==
The zeroth cohomology group is (by definition) the invariants of the Lie algebra acting on the module:

$$H^0(\mathfrak{g}; M) = M^{\mathfrak{g}} = \{ m \in M \mid xm = 0\ \text{ for all } x \in \mathfrak{g}\}.$$

The first cohomology group is the space Der of derivations modulo the space Ider of inner derivations

$$H^1(\mathfrak{g}; M) = \mathrm{Der}(\mathfrak{g}, M)/\mathrm{Ider} (\mathfrak{g}, M)\,$$,

where a derivation is a map $d$ from the Lie algebra to $M$ such that

$$d[x,y] = xdy-ydx~$$

and is called inner if it is given by

$$dx = xa~$$

for some $a$ in $M$.

The second cohomology group

$$H^2(\mathfrak{g}; M)$$

is the space of equivalence classes of Lie algebra extensions

$$0\rightarrow M\rightarrow \mathfrak{h}\rightarrow\mathfrak{g}\rightarrow 0$$

of the Lie algebra by the module $M$.

Similarly, any element of the cohomology group $H^{n+1}(\mathfrak{g}; M)$ gives an equivalence class of ways to extend the Lie algebra $\mathfrak{g}$ to a "Lie $n$-algebra" with $\mathfrak{g}$ in grade zero and $M$ in grade $n-1$. A Lie $n$-algebra is a homotopy Lie algebra with nonzero terms only in degrees 0 through $n-1$.

== Examples ==
=== Cohomology on the trivial module ===
When $M = \mathbb{R}$, as mentioned earlier the Chevalley–Eilenberg complex coincides with the de-Rham complex for a corresponding compact Lie group. In this case $M$ carries the trivial action of $\mathfrak{g}$, so $xa = 0$ for every $x \in \mathfrak{g}, a \in M$.

- The zeroth cohomology group is $M$.
- First cohomology: given a derivation $D$, $xDy = 0$ for all $x$ and $y$, so derivations satisfy $D([x,y]) = 0$ for all commutators, so the ideal $[\mathfrak{g}, \mathfrak{g}]$ is contained in the kernel of $D$.
  - If $[\mathfrak{g}, \mathfrak{g}] = \mathfrak{g}$, as is the case for simple Lie algebras, then $D \equiv 0$, so the space of derivations is trivial, so the first cohomology is trivial.
  - If $\mathfrak{g}$ is abelian, that is, $[\mathfrak{g}, \mathfrak{g}] = 0$, then any linear functional $D: \mathfrak{g} \rightarrow M$ is in fact a derivation, and the set of inner derivations is trivial as they satisfy $Dx = xa = 0$ for any $a \in M$. Then the first cohomology group in this case is $M^{\text{dim}\mathfrak{g}}$. In light of the de-Rham correspondence, this shows the importance of the compact assumption, as this is the first cohomology group of the $n$-torus viewed as an abelian group, and $\mathbb{R}^n$ can also be viewed as an abelian group of dimension $n$, but $\mathbb{R}^n$ has trivial cohomology.
- Second cohomology: The second cohomology group is the space of equivalence classes of central extensions

$$0 \rightarrow \mathfrak{h} \rightarrow \mathfrak{e} \rightarrow \mathfrak{g} \rightarrow 0.$$

Finite dimensional, simple Lie algebras only have trivial central extensions: a proof is provided here.

=== Cohomology on the adjoint module ===
When $M = \mathfrak{g}$, the action is the adjoint action, $x\cdot y = [x,y] = \text{ad}(x)y$.

- The zeroth cohomology group is the center $\mathfrak{z}(\mathfrak{g})$
- First cohomology: the inner derivations are given by $Dx = xy = [x,y] = -\text{ad}(y)x$, so they are precisely the image of $\text{ad}: \mathfrak{g} \rightarrow \operatorname{End} \mathfrak{g}.$ The first cohomology group is the space of outer derivations.

== See also ==
- BRST formalism in theoretical physics.
- Gelfand–Fuks cohomology
