= Theorem of the highest weight =

Theorem in representation theory

In representation theory, a branch of mathematics, the theorem of the highest weight classifies the irreducible representations of a complex semisimple Lie algebra $\mathfrak g$. There is a closely related theorem classifying the irreducible representations of a connected compact Lie group $K$. The theorem states that there is a bijection

$$\lambda \mapsto [V^\lambda]$$

from the set of "dominant integral elements" to the set of equivalence classes of irreducible representations of $\mathfrak g$ or $K$. The difference between the two results is in the precise notion of "integral" in the definition of a dominant integral element. If $K$ is simply connected, this distinction disappears.

The theorem was originally proved by Élie Cartan in his 1913 paper. The version of the theorem for a compact Lie group is due to Hermann Weyl. The theorem is one of the key pieces of representation theory of semisimple Lie algebras.

== Statement ==
=== Lie algebra case ===
Let $\mathfrak{g}$ be a finite-dimensional semisimple complex Lie algebra with Cartan subalgebra $\mathfrak{h}$. Let $R$ be the associated root system. We then say that an element $\lambda\in\mathfrak h^*$ is integral if

$$2\frac{\langle\lambda,\alpha\rangle}{\langle\alpha,\alpha\rangle}$$

is an integer for each root $\alpha$. Next, we choose a set $R^+$ of positive roots and we say that an element $\lambda\in\mathfrak h^*$ is dominant if $\langle\lambda,\alpha\rangle\geq 0$ for all $\alpha\in R^+$. An element $\lambda\in\mathfrak h^*$ is dominant integral if it is both dominant and integral. Finally, if $\lambda$ and $\mu$ are in $\mathfrak h^*$, we say that $\lambda$ is higher than $\mu$ if $\lambda-\mu$ is expressible as a linear combination of positive roots with non-negative real coefficients.

A weight $\lambda$ of a representation $V$ of $\mathfrak g$ is then called a highest weight if $\lambda$ is higher than every other weight $\mu$ of $V$.

The theorem of the highest weight then states:

- If $V$ is a finite-dimensional irreducible representation of $\mathfrak{g}$, then $V$ has a unique highest weight, and this highest weight is dominant integral.
- If two finite-dimensional irreducible representations have the same highest weight, they are isomorphic.
- For each dominant integral element $\lambda$, there exists a finite-dimensional irreducible representation with highest weight $\lambda$.

The most difficult part is the last one; the construction of a finite-dimensional irreducible representation with a prescribed highest weight.

=== The compact group case ===
Let $K$ be a connected compact Lie group with Lie algebra $\mathfrak k$ and let $\mathfrak g:=\mathfrak k+i\mathfrak k$ be the complexification of $\mathfrak k$. Let $T$ be a maximal torus in $K$ with Lie algebra $\mathfrak t$. Then $\mathfrak h:=\mathfrak t+i\mathfrak t$ is a Cartan subalgebra of $\mathfrak g$, and we may form the associated root system $R$. The theory then proceeds in much the same way as in the Lie algebra case, with one crucial difference: the notion of integrality is different. Specifically, we say that an element $\lambda\in\mathfrak h$ is analytically integral if

$$\langle\lambda,H\rangle$$

is an integer whenever

$$e^{2\pi H}=I$$

where $I$ is the identity element of $K$. Every analytically integral element is integral in the Lie algebra sense, but there may be integral elements in the Lie algebra sense that are not analytically integral. This distinction reflects the fact that if $K$ is not simply connected, there may be representations of $\mathfrak g$ that do not come from representations of $K$. On the other hand, if $K$ is simply connected, the notions of "integral" and "analytically integral" coincide.

The theorem of the highest weight for representations of $K$ is then the same as in the Lie algebra case, except that "integral" is replaced by "analytically integral."

== Proofs ==
There are at least four proofs:

- Hermann Weyl's original proof from the compact group point of view, based on the Weyl character formula and the Peter–Weyl theorem.
- The theory of Verma modules contains the highest weight theorem. This is the approach taken in many standard textbooks (e.g., Humphreys and Part II of Hall).
- The Borel–Weil–Bott theorem constructs an irreducible representation as the space of global sections of an ample line bundle; the highest weight theorem results as a consequence. (The approach uses a fair bit of algebraic geometry but yields a very quick proof.)
- The invariant theoretic approach: one constructs irreducible representations as subrepresentations of a tensor power of the standard representations. This approach is essentially due to H. Weyl and works quite well for classical groups.

== See also ==
- Classifying finite-dimensional representations of Lie algebras
- Representation theory of a connected compact Lie group
- Weights in the representation theory of semisimple Lie algebras
