= Semisimple representation =

Representation of a group or algebra that is a direct sum of simple representations

In mathematics, specifically in representation theory, a semisimple representation (also called a completely reducible representation) is a linear representation of a group or an algebra that is a direct sum of simple representations (also called irreducible representations). It is an example of the general mathematical notion of semisimplicity.

Many representations that appear in applications of representation theory are semisimple or can be approximated by semisimple representations. A semisimple module over an algebra over a field is an example of a semisimple representation. Conversely, a semisimple representation of a group G over a field k is a semisimple module over the group algebra k[G].

== Equivalent characterizations ==
Let V be a representation of a group G; or more generally, let V be a vector space with a set of linear endomorphisms acting on it. In general, a vector space acted on by a set of linear endomorphisms is said to be simple (or irreducible) if the only invariant subspaces for those operators are zero and the vector space itself; a semisimple representation then is a direct sum of simple representations in that sense.

The following are equivalent:

1. V is semisimple as a representation.
2. V is a sum of simple subrepresentations.
3. Each subrepresentation W of V admits a complementary representation: a subrepresentation W' such that $V = W \oplus W'$.

The equivalence of the above conditions can be proved based on the following lemma, which is of independent interest:

Lemma—Let p:V → W be a surjective equivariant map between representations. If V is semisimple, then p splits; i.e., it admits a section.

Proof of the lemma: Write $V = \bigoplus_{i\in I} V_i$ where $V_i$ are simple representations. Without loss of generality, we can assume $V_i$ are subrepresentations; i.e., we can assume the direct sum is internal. Now, consider the family of all possible direct sums $V_J := \bigoplus_{i \in J} V_i \subset V$ with various subsets $J \subset I$. Put the partial ordering on it by saying the direct sum over K is less than the direct sum over J if $K \subset J$. By Zorn's lemma, we can find a maximal $J \subset I$ such that $\operatorname{ker}p \cap V_J = 0$. We claim that $V=\operatorname{ker}p\oplus V_J$. By definition, $\operatorname{ker}p\cap V_J=0$ so we only need to show that $V=\operatorname{ker}p+V_J$. If $\operatorname{ker}p+V_J$ is a proper subrepresentation of $V$ then there exists $k\in I - J$ such that $V_k\not\subset \operatorname{ker}p+V_J$. Since $V_k$ is simple (irreducible), $V_k\cap(\operatorname{ker}p+V_J)=0$. This contradicts the maximality of $J$, so $V=\operatorname{ker}p\oplus V_J$ as claimed. Hence, $W \simeq V/\operatorname{ker}p\simeq V_J \to V$ is a section of p. $\square$

Note that we cannot take $J$ to the set of $i$ such that $\ker(p) \cap V_i = 0$. The reason is that it can happen, and frequently does, that $X$ is a subspace of $Y\oplus Z$ and yet $X\cap Y = 0 = X\cap Z$. For example, take $X$, $Y$ and $Z$ to be three distinct lines through the origin in $\mathbb{R}^2$. For an explicit counterexample, let $A = \operatorname{Mat}_2 F$ be the algebra of 2-by-2 matrices and set $V=A$, the regular representation of $A$. Set
$$V_1=\Bigl\{\begin{pmatrix}a&0\\b&0\end{pmatrix}\Bigr\}$$
and
$$V_2=\Bigl\{\begin{pmatrix}0&c\\0&d\end{pmatrix}\Bigr\}$$
and set
$$W = \Bigl\{\begin{pmatrix}c&c\\d&d\end{pmatrix}\Bigr\}$$
. Then $V_1$, $V_2$ and $W$ are all irreducible $A$-modules and $V = V_1\oplus V_2$. Let $p: V\to V/W$ be the natural surjection. Then $\operatorname{ker}p = W \ne 0$ and $V_1 \cap \operatorname{ker}p = 0 = V_2 \cap \operatorname{ker}p$. In this case, $W\simeq V_1\simeq V_2$ but $V \ne \operatorname{ker}p \oplus V_1\oplus V_2$ because this sum is not direct.

Proof of equivalences $1. \Rightarrow 3.$: Take p to be the natural surjection $V \to V/W$. Since V is semisimple, p splits and so, through a section, $V/W$ is isomorphic to a subrepresentation that is complementary to W.

$3. \Rightarrow 2.$: We shall first observe that every nonzero subrepresentation W has a simple subrepresentation. Shrinking W to a (nonzero) cyclic subrepresentation we can assume it is finitely generated. Then it has a maximal subrepresentation U. By the condition 3., $V = U \oplus U'$ for some $U'$. By modular law, it implies $W = U \oplus (W \cap U')$. Then $(W \cap U') \simeq W/U$ is a simple subrepresentation of W ("simple" because of maximality). This establishes the observation. Now, take $W$ to be the sum of all simple subrepresentations, which, by 3., admits a complementary representation $W'$. If $W' \ne 0$, then, by the early observation, $W'$ contains a simple subrepresentation and so $W \cap W' \ne 0$, a nonsense. Hence, $W' = 0$.

$2. \Rightarrow 1.$: The implication is a direct generalization of a basic fact in linear algebra that a basis can be extracted from a spanning set of a vector space. That is we can prove the following slightly more precise statement:

- When $V = \sum_{i \in I} V_i$ is a sum of simple subrepresentations, a semisimple decomposition $V = \bigoplus_{i\in I'} V_i$, some subset $I' \subset I$, can be extracted from the sum.

As in the proof of the lemma, we can find a maximal direct sum $W$ that consists of some $V_i$'s. Now, for each i in I, by simplicity, either $V_i \subset W$ or $V_i \cap W = 0$. In the second case, the direct sum $W \oplus V_i$ is a contradiction to the maximality of W. Hence, $V_i \subset W$. $\square$

== Examples and non-examples ==
=== Unitary representations ===
A finite-dimensional unitary representation (i.e., a representation factoring through a unitary group) is a basic example of a semisimple representation. Such a representation is semisimple since if W is a subrepresentation, then the orthogonal complement to W is a complementary representation because if $v \in W^{\bot}$ and $g \in G$, then $\langle \pi(g) v, w \rangle = \langle v, \pi(g^{-1}) w \rangle = 0$ for any w in W since W is G-invariant, and so $\pi(g) v \in W^{\bot}$.

For example, given a continuous finite-dimensional complex representation $\pi: G \to GL(V)$ of a finite group or a compact group G, by the averaging argument, one can define an inner product $\langle\, , \rangle$ on V that is G-invariant: i.e., $\langle \pi(g) v, \pi(g) w \rangle = \langle v, w \rangle$, which is to say $\pi(g)$ is a unitary operator and so $\pi$ is a unitary representation. Hence, every finite-dimensional continuous complex representation of G is semisimple. For a finite group, this is a special case of Maschke's theorem, which says a finite-dimensional representation of a finite group G over a field k with characteristic not dividing the order of G is semisimple.

=== Representations of semisimple Lie algebras ===
By Weyl's theorem on complete reducibility, every finite-dimensional representation of a semisimple Lie algebra over a field of characteristic zero is semisimple.

=== Separable minimal polynomials ===
Given a linear endomorphism T of a vector space V, V is semisimple as a representation of T (i.e., T is a semisimple operator) if and only if the minimal polynomial of T is separable; i.e., a product of distinct irreducible polynomials.

=== Associated semisimple representation ===
Given a finite-dimensional representation V, the Jordan–Hölder theorem says there is a filtration by subrepresentations: $V = V_0 \supset V_1 \supset \cdots \supset V_n = 0$ such that each successive quotient $V_i/V_{i+1}$ is a simple representation. Then the associated vector space $\operatorname{gr} V := \bigoplus_{i = 0}^{n - 1}V_i/V_{i+1}$ is a semisimple representation called an associated semisimple representation, which, up to an isomorphism, is uniquely determined by V.

=== Unipotent group non-example ===
A representation of a unipotent group is generally not semisimple. Take $G$ to be the group consisting of real matrices
$$\begin{bmatrix}
1 & a \\
0 & 1
\end{bmatrix}$$
; it acts on $V = \mathbb{R}^2$ in a natural way and makes V a representation of G. If W is a subrepresentation of V that has dimension 1, then a simple calculation shows that it must be spanned by the vector
$$\begin{bmatrix}
1 \\
0
\end{bmatrix}$$
. That is, there are exactly three G-subrepresentations of V; in particular, V is not semisimple (as a unique one-dimensional subrepresentation does not admit a complementary representation).

== Semisimple decomposition and multiplicity ==
The decomposition of a semisimple representation into simple ones, called a semisimple decomposition, need not be unique; for example, for a trivial representation, simple representations are one-dimensional vector spaces and thus a semisimple decomposition amounts to a choice of a basis of the representation vector space. The isotypic decomposition, on the other hand, is an example of a unique decomposition.

However, for a finite-dimensional semisimple representation V over an algebraically closed field, the numbers of simple representations up to isomorphism appearing in the decomposition of V (1) are unique and (2) completely determine the representation up to isomorphism; this is a consequence of Schur's lemma in the following way. Suppose a finite-dimensional semisimple representation V over an algebraically closed field is given: by definition, it is a direct sum of simple representations. By grouping together simple representations in the decomposition that are isomorphic to each other, up to an isomorphism, one finds a decomposition (not necessarily unique):

$$V \simeq \bigoplus_i V_i^{\oplus m_i}$$

where $V_i$ are simple representations, mutually non-isomorphic to one another, and $m_i$ are positive integers. By Schur's lemma,

$$m_i = \dim \operatorname{Hom}_{\text{equiv}}(V_i, V) = \dim \operatorname{Hom}_{\text{equiv}}(V, V_i)$$,

where $\operatorname{Hom}_{\text{equiv}}$ refers to the equivariant linear maps. Also, each $m_i$ is unchanged if $V_i$ is replaced by another simple representation isomorphic to $V_i$. Thus, the integers $m_i$ are independent of chosen decompositions; they are the multiplicities of simple representations $V_i$, up to isomorphism, in V.

In general, given a finite-dimensional representation $\pi: G \to GL(V)$ of a group G over a field k, the composition $\chi_V : G \,\overset{\pi}{\to}\, GL(V) \,\overset{\operatorname{tr}}{\to}\, k$ is called the character of $(\pi, V)$. When $(\pi, V)$ is semisimple with the decomposition $V \simeq \bigoplus_i V_i^{\oplus m_i}$ as above, the trace $\operatorname{tr}(\pi(g))$ is the sum of the traces of $\pi(g) : V_i \to V_i$ with multiplicities and thus, as functions on G,

$$\chi_V = \sum_i m_i \chi_{V_i}$$

where $\chi_{V_i}$ are the characters of $V_i$. When G is a finite group or more generally a compact group and $V$ is a unitary representation with the inner product given by the averaging argument, the Schur orthogonality relations say: the irreducible characters (characters of simple representations) of G are an orthonormal subset of the space of complex-valued functions on G and thus $m_i = \langle \chi_V, \chi_{V_i} \rangle$.

== Isotypic decomposition ==
There is a decomposition of a semisimple representation that is unique, called the isotypic decomposition of the representation. By definition, given a simple representation S, the isotypic component of type S of a representation V is the sum of all subrepresentations of V that are isomorphic to S; note the component is also isomorphic to the direct sum of some choice of subrepresentations isomorphic to S (so the component is unique, while the summands are not necessary so).

Then the isotypic decomposition of a semisimple representation V is the (unique) direct sum decomposition:

$$V = \bigoplus_{\lambda \in \widehat{G}} V^{\lambda}$$

where $\widehat{G}$ is the set of isomorphism classes of simple representations of G and $V^{\lambda}$ is the isotypic component of V of type S for some $S \in \lambda$.

=== Isotypic component ===
The isotypic component of weight $\lambda$ of a Lie algebra module is the sum of all submodules which are isomorphic to the highest weight module with weight $\lambda$.

==== Definition ====
- A finite-dimensional module $V$ of a reductive Lie algebra $\mathfrak{g}$ (or of the corresponding Lie group) can be decomposed into irreducible submodules

$$V = \bigoplus_{i=1}^N V_i$$.

- Each finite-dimensional irreducible representation of $\mathfrak{g}$ is uniquely identified (up to isomorphism) by its highest weight

$\forall i \in \{1,\ldots,N\} \,\exists \lambda \in P(\mathfrak{g}) : V_i \simeq M_\lambda$, where $M_\lambda$ denotes the highest weight module with highest weight $\lambda$.

- In the decomposition of $V$, a certain isomorphism class might appear more than once, hence

$$V \simeq \bigoplus_{\lambda \in P(\mathfrak{g})} (\bigoplus_{i=1}^{d_\lambda} M_{\lambda})$$.

This defines the isotypic component of weight $\lambda$ of $V$: $\lambda(V) := \bigoplus_{i=1}^{d_\lambda} V_i \simeq \mathbb{C}^{d_\lambda} \otimes M_{\lambda}$ where $d_\lambda$ is maximal.

=== Example ===
Let $V$ be the space of homogeneous degree-three polynomials over the complex numbers in variables $x_1,x_2,x_3$. Then $S_3$ acts on $V$ by permutation of the three variables. This is a finite-dimensional complex representation of a finite group, and so is semisimple. Therefore, this 10-dimensional representation can be broken up into three isotypic components, each corresponding to one of the three irreducible representations of $S_3$. In particular, $V$ contains three copies of the trivial representation, one copy of the sign representation, and three copies of the two-dimensional irreducible representation $W$ of $S_3$. For example, the span of $x_1^2x_2-x_2^2x_1 + x_1^2x_3-x_2^2x_3$ and $x_2^2x_3-x_3^2x_2 + x_2^2x_1-x_3^2x_1$ is isomorphic to $W$. This can more easily be seen by writing this two-dimensional subspace as

$$W_1=\{a(x_1^2x_2+x_1^2x_3)+b(x_2^2x_1+x_2^2x_3)+c(x_3^2x_1+x_3^2x_2)\mid a+b+c = 0\}$$.

Another copy of $W$ can be written in a similar form:

$$W_2=\{a(x_2^2x_1+x_3^2x_1)+b(x_1^2x_2+x_3^2x_2)+c(x_1^2x_3+x_2^2x_3)\mid a+b+c = 0\}$$.

So can the third:

$$W_3=\{ax_1^3+bx_2^3+cx_3^3\mid a+b+c = 0\}$$.

Then $W_1 \oplus W_2 \oplus W_3$ is the isotypic component of type $W$ in $V$.

== Completion ==
In Fourier analysis, one decomposes a (nice) function as the limit of the Fourier series of the function. In much the same way, a representation itself may not be semisimple but it may be the completion (in a suitable sense) of a semisimple representation. The most basic case of this is the Peter–Weyl theorem, which decomposes the left (or right) regular representation of a compact group into the Hilbert-space completion of the direct sum of all simple unitary representations. As a corollary, there is a natural decomposition for $W = L^2(G)$ = the Hilbert space of (classes of) square-integrable functions on a compact group G:

$$W \simeq \widehat{\bigoplus_{[(\pi, V)]}} V^{\oplus \dim V}$$

where $\widehat{\bigoplus}$ means the completion of the direct sum and the direct sum runs over all isomorphism classes of simple finite-dimensional unitary representations $(\pi, V)$ of G. (Note: To be precise, the theorem concerns the regular representation of $G \times G$ and the above statement is a corollary.) Note here that every simple unitary representation (up to an isomorphism) appears in the sum with the multiplicity the dimension of the representation.

When the group G is a finite group, the vector space $W = \mathbb{C}[G]$ is simply the group algebra of G and also the completion is vacuous. Thus, the theorem simply says that

$$\mathbb{C}[G] = \bigoplus_{[(\pi, V)]} V^{\oplus \dim V}.$$

That is, each simple representation of G appears in the regular representation with multiplicity the dimension of the representation. This is one of standard facts in the representation theory of a finite group (and is much easier to prove).

When the group G is the circle group $S^1$, the theorem exactly amounts to the classical Fourier analysis.

== Applications to physics ==
In quantum mechanics and particle physics, the angular momentum of an object can be described by complex representations of the rotation group SO(3), all of which are semisimple. Due to connection between SO(3) and SU(2), the non-relativistic spin of an elementary particle is described by complex representations of SU(2) and the relativistic spin is described by complex representations of SL_{2}(C), all of which are semisimple. In angular momentum coupling, Clebsch–Gordan coefficients arise from the multiplicities of irreducible representations occurring in the semisimple decomposition of a tensor product of irreducible representations.
