= Weyl's theorem on complete reducibility =

In algebra, Weyl's theorem on complete reducibility is a fundamental result in the theory of Lie algebra representations (specifically in the representation theory of semisimple Lie algebras). Let $\mathfrak{g}$ be a semisimple Lie algebra over a field of characteristic zero. The theorem states that every finite-dimensional module over $\mathfrak{g}$ is semisimple as a module (i.e., a direct sum of simple modules.)

== The enveloping algebra is semisimple ==
Weyl's theorem implies (in fact is equivalent to) that the enveloping algebra of a finite-dimensional representation is a semisimple ring in the following way.

Given a finite-dimensional Lie algebra representation $\pi: \mathfrak{g} \to \mathfrak{gl}(V)$, let $A \subset \operatorname{End}(V)$ be the associative subalgebra of the endomorphism algebra of V generated by $\pi(\mathfrak g)$. The ring A is called the enveloping algebra of $\pi$. If $\pi$ is semisimple, then A is semisimple. (Proof: Since A is a finite-dimensional algebra, it is an Artinian ring; in particular, the Jacobson radical J is nilpotent. If V is simple, then $JV \subset V$ implies that $JV = 0$. In general, J kills each simple submodule of V; in particular, J kills V and so J is zero.) Conversely, if A is semisimple, then V is a semisimple A-module; i.e., semisimple as a $\mathfrak g$-module. (Note that a module over a semisimple ring is semisimple since a module is a quotient of a free module and "semisimple" is preserved under the free and quotient constructions.)

== Application: preservation of Jordan decomposition ==
Here is a typical application.

Proposition—Let $\mathfrak g$ be a semisimple finite-dimensional Lie algebra over a field of characteristic zero and $x$ an element of $\mathfrak g$. (Note: Editorial note: this fact is usually stated for a field of characteristic zero, but the proof needs only that the base field be perfect.)

1. There exists a unique pair of elements $x_s, x_n$ in $\mathfrak g$ such that $x = x_s + x_n$, $\operatorname{ad}(x_s)$ is semisimple, $\operatorname{ad}(x_n)$ is nilpotent and $[x_s, x_n] = 0$.
2. If $\pi : \mathfrak{g} \to \mathfrak{gl}(V)$ is a finite-dimensional representation, then $\pi(x)_s = \pi(x_s)$ and $\pi(x)_n = \pi(x_n)$, where $\pi(x)_s, \pi(x)_n$ denote the Jordan decomposition of the semisimple and nilpotent parts of the endomorphism $\pi(x)$.

In short, the semisimple and nilpotent parts of an element of $\mathfrak g$ are well-defined and are determined independent of a faithful finite-dimensional representation.

Proof: First we prove the special case of (i) and (ii) when $\pi$ is the inclusion; i.e., $\mathfrak g$ is a subalgebra of $\mathfrak{gl}_n = \mathfrak{gl}(V)$. Let $x = S + N$ be the Jordan decomposition of the endomorphism $x$, where $S, N$ are semisimple and nilpotent endomorphisms in $\mathfrak{gl}_n$. Now, $\operatorname{ad}_{\mathfrak{gl}_n}(x)$ also has the Jordan decomposition, which can be shown (see Jordan–Chevalley decomposition) to respect the above Jordan decomposition; i.e., $\operatorname{ad}_{\mathfrak{gl}_n}(S), \operatorname{ad}_{\mathfrak{gl}_n}(N)$ are the semisimple and nilpotent parts of $\operatorname{ad}_{\mathfrak{gl}_n}(x)$. Since $\operatorname{ad}_{\mathfrak{gl}_n}(S), \operatorname{ad}_{\mathfrak{gl}_n}(N)$ are polynomials in $\operatorname{ad}_{\mathfrak{gl}_n}(x)$ then, we see $\operatorname{ad}_{\mathfrak{gl}_n}(S), \operatorname{ad}_{\mathfrak{gl}_n}(N) : \mathfrak g \to \mathfrak g$. Thus, they are derivations of $\mathfrak{g}$. Since $\mathfrak{g}$ is semisimple, we can find elements $s, n$ in $\mathfrak{g}$ such that $[y, S] = [y, s], y \in \mathfrak{g}$ and similarly for $n$. Now, let A be the enveloping algebra of $\mathfrak{g}$; i.e., the subalgebra of the endomorphism algebra of V generated by $\mathfrak g$. As noted above, A has zero Jacobson radical. Since $[y, N - n] = 0$, we see that $N - n$ is a nilpotent element in the center of A. But, in general, a central nilpotent belongs to the Jacobson radical; hence, $N = n$ and thus also $S = s$. This proves the special case.

In general, $\pi(x)$ is semisimple (resp. nilpotent) when $\operatorname{ad}(x)$ is semisimple (resp. nilpotent). This immediately gives (i) and (ii). $\square$

== Proofs ==
=== Analytic proof ===
Weyl's original proof (for complex semisimple Lie algebras) was analytic in nature: it famously used the unitarian trick. Specifically, one can show that every complex semisimple Lie algebra $\mathfrak{g}$ is the complexification of the Lie algebra of a simply connected compact Lie group $K$. (If, for example, $\mathfrak{g}=\mathrm{sl}(n;\mathbb{C})$, then $K=\mathrm{SU}(n)$.) Given a representation $\pi$ of $\mathfrak{g}$ on a vector space $V,$ one can first restrict $\pi$ to the Lie algebra $\mathfrak{k}$ of $K$. Then, since $K$ is simply connected, there is an associated representation $\Pi$ of $K$. Integration over $K$ produces an inner product on $V$ for which $\Pi$ is unitary. Complete reducibility of $\Pi$ is then immediate and elementary arguments show that the original representation $\pi$ of $\mathfrak{g}$ is also completely reducible.

=== Algebraic proof 1 ===
Let $(\pi, V)$ be a finite-dimensional representation of a Lie algebra $\mathfrak g$ over a field of characteristic zero. The theorem is an easy consequence of Whitehead's lemma, which says $V \to \operatorname{Der}(\mathfrak g, V), v \mapsto \cdot v$ is surjective, where a linear map $f: \mathfrak g \to V$ is a derivation if $f([x, y]) = x \cdot f(y) - y \cdot f(x)$. The proof is essentially due to Whitehead.

Let $W \subset V$ be a subrepresentation. Consider the vector subspace $L_W \subset \operatorname{End}(V)$ that consists of all linear maps $t: V \to V$ such that $t(V) \subset W$ and $t(W) = 0$. It has a structure of a $\mathfrak{g}$-module given by: for $x \in \mathfrak{g}, t \in L_W$,

$$x \cdot t = [\pi(x), t]$$.

Now, pick some projection $p : V \to V$ onto W and consider $f : \mathfrak{g} \to L_W$ given by $f(x) = [p, \pi(x)]$. Since $f$ is a derivation, by Whitehead's lemma, we can write $f(x) = x \cdot t$ for some $t \in L_W$. We then have $[\pi(x), p + t] = 0, x \in \mathfrak{g}$; that is to say $p + t$ is $\mathfrak{g}$-linear. Also, as t kills $W$, $p + t$ is an idempotent such that $(p + t)(V) = W$. The kernel of $p + t$ is then a complementary representation to $W$. $\square$

=== Algebraic proof 2 ===
Whitehead's lemma is typically proved by means of the quadratic Casimir element of the universal enveloping algebra, and there is also a proof of the theorem that uses the Casimir element directly instead of Whitehead's lemma.

Since the quadratic Casimir element $C$ is in the center of the universal enveloping algebra, Schur's lemma tells us that $C$ acts as multiple $c_\lambda$ of the identity in the irreducible representation of $\mathfrak{g}$ with highest weight $\lambda$. A key point is to establish that $c_\lambda$ is nonzero whenever the representation is nontrivial. This can be done by a general argument or by the explicit formula for $c_\lambda$.

Consider a very special case of the theorem on complete reducibility: the case where a representation $V$ contains a nontrivial, irreducible, invariant subspace $W$ of codimension one. Let $C_V$ denote the action of $C$ on $V$. Since $V$ is not irreducible, $C_V$ is not necessarily a multiple of the identity, but it is a self-intertwining operator for $V$. Then the restriction of $C_V$ to $W$ is a nonzero multiple of the identity. But since the quotient $V/W$ is a one dimensional—and therefore trivial—representation of $\mathfrak{g}$, the action of $C$ on the quotient is trivial. It then easily follows that $C_V$ must have a nonzero kernel—and the kernel is an invariant subspace, since $C_V$ is a self-intertwiner. The kernel is then a one-dimensional invariant subspace, whose intersection with $W$ is zero. Thus, $\mathrm{ker}(C_V)$ is an invariant complement to $W$, so that $V$ decomposes as a direct sum of irreducible subspaces:

$$V=W\oplus\mathrm{ker}(C_V)$$.

Although this establishes only a very special case of the desired result, this step is actually the critical one in the general argument.

=== Algebraic proof 3 ===
The theorem can be deduced from the theory of Verma modules, which characterizes a simple module as a quotient of a Verma module by a maximal submodule. This approach has an advantage that it can be used to weaken the finite-dimensionality assumptions (on algebra and representation).

Let $V$ be a finite-dimensional representation of a finite-dimensional semisimple Lie algebra $\mathfrak g$ over an algebraically closed field of characteristic zero. Let $\mathfrak b = \mathfrak{h} \oplus \mathfrak{n}_+ \subset \mathfrak{g}$ be the Borel subalgebra determined by a choice of a Cartan subalgebra and positive roots. Let $V^0 = \{ v \in V | \mathfrak{n}_+(v) = 0 \}$. Then $V^0$ is an $\mathfrak h$-module and thus has the $\mathfrak h$-weight space decomposition:

$$V^0 = \bigoplus_{\lambda \in L} V^0_{\lambda}$$

where $L \subset \mathfrak{h}^*$. For each $\lambda \in L$, pick $0 \ne v_{\lambda} \in V_{\lambda}$ and $V^{\lambda} \subset V$ the $\mathfrak g$-submodule generated by $v_{\lambda}$ and $V' \subset V$ the $\mathfrak g$-submodule generated by $V^0$. We claim: $V = V'$. Suppose $V \ne V'$. By Lie's theorem, there exists a $\mathfrak{b}$-weight vector in $V/V'$; thus, we can find an $\mathfrak{h}$-weight vector $v$ such that $0 \ne e_i(v) \in V'$ for some $e_i$ among the Chevalley generators. Now, $e_i(v)$ has weight $\mu + \alpha_i$. Since $L$ is partially ordered, there is a $\lambda \in L$ such that $\lambda \ge \mu + \alpha_i$; i.e., $\lambda > \mu$. But this is a contradiction since $\lambda, \mu$ are both primitive weights (it is known that the primitive weights are incomparable.). Similarly, each $V^{\lambda}$ is simple as a $\mathfrak g$-module. Indeed, if it is not simple, then, for some $\mu < \lambda$, $V^0_{\mu}$ contains some nonzero vector that is not a highest-weight vector; again a contradiction. $\square$

== Algebraic proof 4 ==
There is also a quick homological algebra proof; see Weibel's homological algebra book.
