= Gelfand–Fuks cohomology =

In mathematics, Gelfand–Fuks cohomology, introduced by Israel Gelfand and Dmitry Fuchs in (Gel'fand & Fuks 1969–70), is a cohomology theory for Lie algebras of smooth vector fields. It differs from the Lie algebra cohomology of Chevalley-Eilenberg in that its cochains are taken to be continuous $\mathbb{R}-$multilinear alternating forms on the Lie algebra of smooth vector fields where the latter is given the $C^{\infty}$ topology.
