= Semisimple operator =

Linear operator

In mathematics, a linear operator T : V → V on a vector space V is semisimple if every T-invariant subspace has a complementary T-invariant subspace. If T is a semisimple linear operator on V, then V is a semisimple representation of T. Equivalently, a linear operator is semisimple if its minimal polynomial is a product of distinct irreducible polynomials.

A linear operator on a finite-dimensional vector space over an algebraically closed field is semisimple if and only if it is diagonalizable.

Over a perfect field, the Jordan–Chevalley decomposition expresses an endomorphism $x : V \to V$ as a sum of a semisimple endomorphism s and a nilpotent endomorphism n such that both s and n are polynomials in x.
