= Lie algebra representation =

Representation of a Lie algebra as a set of linear transformations

In the mathematical field of representation theory, a Lie algebra representation or representation of a Lie algebra is a way of writing a Lie algebra as a set of matrices (or endomorphisms of a vector space) in such a way that the Lie bracket is given by the commutator. In the language of physics, one looks for a vector space $V$ together with a collection of operators on $V$ satisfying some fixed set of commutation relations, such as the relations satisfied by the angular momentum operators.

The notion is closely related to that of a representation of a Lie group. Roughly speaking, the representations of Lie algebras are the differentiated form of representations of Lie groups, while the representations of the universal cover of a Lie group are the integrated form of the representations of its Lie algebra.

In the study of representations of a Lie algebra, a particular ring, called the universal enveloping algebra, associated with the Lie algebra plays an important role. The universality of this ring says that the category of representations of a Lie algebra is the same as the category of modules over its enveloping algebra.

== Formal definition ==
Let $\mathfrak g$ be a Lie algebra and let $V$ be a vector space. We let $\mathfrak{gl}(V)$ denote the space of endomorphisms of $V$, that is, the space of all linear maps of $V$ to itself. Here, the associative algebra $\mathfrak{gl}(V)$ is turned into a Lie algebra with bracket given by the commutator: $[s,t]=s \circ t-t \circ s$ for all s,t in $\mathfrak{gl}(V)$. Then a representation of $\mathfrak g$ on $V$ is a Lie algebra homomorphism

$$\rho\colon \mathfrak g \to \mathfrak{gl}(V)$$.

Explicitly, this means that $\rho$ should be a linear map and it should satisfy

$$\rho([X,Y])=\rho(X)\rho(Y)-\rho(Y)\rho(X)$$

for all X, Y in $\mathfrak g$. The vector space V, together with the representation ρ, is called a $\mathfrak g$-module. (Many authors abuse terminology and refer to V itself as the representation).

The representation $\rho$ is said to be faithful if it is injective.

One can equivalently define a $\mathfrak g$-module as a vector space V together with a bilinear map $\mathfrak g \times V\to V$ such that

$$[X,Y]\cdot v = X\cdot(Y\cdot v) - Y\cdot(X\cdot v)$$

for all X,Y in $\mathfrak g$ and v in V. This is related to the previous definition by setting X ⋅ v = ρ(X)(v).

== Examples ==
=== Adjoint representations ===
The most basic example of a Lie algebra representation is the adjoint representation of a Lie algebra $\mathfrak{g}$ on itself:

$$\textrm{ad}:\mathfrak{g} \to \mathfrak{gl}(\mathfrak{g}), \quad X \mapsto \operatorname{ad}_X, \quad \operatorname{ad}_X(Y) = [X, Y].$$

Indeed, by virtue of the Jacobi identity, $\operatorname{ad}$ is a Lie algebra homomorphism.

=== Infinitesimal Lie group representations ===
A Lie algebra representation also arises in nature. If $\phi$: G → H is a homomorphism of (real or complex) Lie groups, and $\mathfrak g$ and $\mathfrak h$ are the Lie algebras of G and H respectively, then the differential $d_e \phi: \mathfrak g \to \mathfrak h$ on tangent spaces at the identities is a Lie algebra homomorphism. In particular, for a finite-dimensional vector space V, a representation of Lie groups

$$\phi: G\to \operatorname{GL}(V)\,$$

determines a Lie algebra homomorphism

$$d \phi: \mathfrak g \to \mathfrak{gl}(V)$$

from $\mathfrak g$ to the Lie algebra of the general linear group GL(V), i.e. the endomorphism algebra of V.

For example, let $c_g(x) = gxg^{-1}$. Then the differential of $c_g: G \to G$ at the identity is an element of $\operatorname{GL}(\mathfrak{g})$. Denoting it by $\operatorname{Ad}(g)$ one obtains a representation $\operatorname{Ad}$ of G on the vector space $\mathfrak{g}$. This is the adjoint representation of G. Applying the preceding, one gets the Lie algebra representation $d\operatorname{Ad}$. It can be shown that $d_e\operatorname{Ad} = \operatorname{ad}$, the adjoint representation of $\mathfrak g$.

A partial converse to this statement says that every representation of a finite-dimensional (real or complex) Lie algebra lifts to a unique representation of the associated simply connected Lie group, so that representations of simply-connected Lie groups are in one-to-one correspondence with representations of their Lie algebras.

=== In quantum physics ===
In quantum theory, one considers "observables" that are self-adjoint operators on a Hilbert space. The commutation relations among these operators are then an important tool. The angular momentum operators, for example, satisfy the commutation relations

$$[L_x,L_y]=i\hbar L_z, \;\; [L_y,L_z]=i\hbar L_x, \;\; [L_z,L_x]=i\hbar L_y$$.

Thus, the span of these three operators forms a Lie algebra, which is isomorphic to the Lie algebra so(3) of the rotation group SO(3). Then if $V$ is any subspace of the quantum Hilbert space that is invariant under the angular momentum operators, $V$ will constitute a representation of the Lie algebra so(3). An understanding of the representation theory of so(3) is of great help in, for example, analyzing Hamiltonians with rotational symmetry, such as the hydrogen atom. Many other interesting Lie algebras (and their representations) arise in other parts of quantum physics. Indeed, the history of representation theory is characterized by rich interactions between mathematics and physics.

== Basic concepts ==
=== Invariant subspaces and irreducibility ===
Given a representation $\rho:\mathfrak{g}\rightarrow\operatorname{End}(V)$ of a Lie algebra $\mathfrak{g}$, we say that a subspace $W$ of $V$ is invariant if $\rho(X)w\in W$ for all $w\in W$ and $X\in\mathfrak{g}$. A nonzero representation is said to be irreducible if the only invariant subspaces are $V$ itself and the zero space $\{0\}$. The term simple module is also used for an irreducible representation.

=== Homomorphisms ===
Let $\mathfrak{g}$ be a Lie algebra. Let V, W be $\mathfrak{g}$-modules. Then a linear map $f: V \to W$ is a homomorphism of $\mathfrak{g}$-modules if it is $\mathfrak{g}$-equivariant; i.e., $f(X\cdot v) = X\cdot f(v)$ for any $X \in \mathfrak{g},\, v \in V$. If f is bijective, $V, W$ are said to be equivalent. Such maps are also referred to as intertwining maps or morphisms.

Similarly, many other constructions from module theory in abstract algebra carry over to this setting: submodule, quotient, subquotient, direct sum, Jordan-Hölder series, etc.

=== Schur's lemma ===
A simple but useful tool in studying irreducible representations is Schur's lemma. It has two parts:

- If V, W are irreducible $\mathfrak{g}$-modules and $f: V \to W$ is a homomorphism, then $f$ is either zero or an isomorphism.
- If V is an irreducible $\mathfrak{g}$-module over an algebraically closed field and $f: V \to V$ is a homomorphism, then $f$ is a scalar multiple of the identity.

=== Complete reducibility ===
Let V be a representation of a Lie algebra $\mathfrak{g}$. Then V is said to be completely reducible (or semisimple) if it is isomorphic to a direct sum of irreducible representations (cf. semisimple module). If V is finite-dimensional, then V is completely reducible if and only if every invariant subspace of V has an invariant complement. (That is, if W is an invariant subspace, then there is another invariant subspace P such that V is the direct sum of W and P.)

If $\mathfrak{g}$ is a finite-dimensional semisimple Lie algebra over a field of characteristic zero and V is finite-dimensional, then V is semisimple; this is Weyl's complete reducibility theorem. Thus, for semisimple Lie algebras, a classification of irreducible (i.e. simple) representations leads immediately to classification of all representations. For other Lie algebra, which do not have this special property, classifying the irreducible representations may not help much in classifying general representations.

A Lie algebra is said to be reductive if the adjoint representation is semisimple. Certainly, every (finite-dimensional) semisimple Lie algebra $\mathfrak g$ is reductive, since every representation of $\mathfrak g$ is completely reducible, as we have just noted. In the other direction, the definition of a reductive Lie algebra means that it decomposes as a direct sum of ideals (i.e., invariant subspaces for the adjoint representation) that have no nontrivial sub-ideals. Some of these ideals will be one-dimensional and the rest are simple Lie algebras. Thus, a reductive Lie algebra is a direct sum of a commutative algebra and a semisimple algebra.

=== Invariants ===
An element v of V is said to be $\mathfrak{g}$-invariant if $x\cdot v = 0$ for all $x \in \mathfrak{g}$. The set of all invariant elements is denoted by $V^\mathfrak{g}$.

== Basic constructions ==
=== Tensor products of representations ===
If we have two representations of a Lie algebra $\mathfrak{g}$, with V_{1} and V_{2} as their underlying vector spaces, then the tensor product of the representations would have V_{1} ⊗ V_{2} as the underlying vector space, with the action of $\mathfrak{g}$ uniquely determined by the assumption that

$$X\cdot(v_1\otimes v_2)=(X\cdot v_1)\otimes v_2+v_1\otimes (X\cdot v_2) .$$

for all $v_1\in V_1$ and $v_2\in V_2$.

In the language of homomorphisms, this means that we define $\rho_1\otimes\rho_2:\mathfrak{g}\rightarrow\mathfrak{gl}(V_1\otimes V_2)$ by the formula

$(\rho_1\otimes\rho_2)(X)=\rho_1(X)\otimes \mathrm{I}+\mathrm{I}\otimes\rho_2(X)$. This is called the Kronecker sum of $\rho_1$ and $\rho_2$, defined in Matrix addition#Kronecker_sum and Kronecker product#Properties, and more specifically in Tensor product of representations.

In the physics literature, the tensor product with the identity operator is often suppressed in the notation, with the formula written as

$$(\rho_1\otimes\rho_2)(X)=\rho_1(X)+\rho_2(X)$$,

where it is understood that $\rho_1(x)$ acts on the first factor in the tensor product and $\rho_2(x)$ acts on the second factor in the tensor product. In the context of representations of the Lie algebra su(2), the tensor product of representations goes under the name "addition of angular momentum." In this context, $\rho_1(X)$ might, for example, be the orbital angular momentum while $\rho_2(X)$ is the spin angular momentum.

=== Dual representations ===
Let $\mathfrak{g}$ be a Lie algebra and $\rho:\mathfrak{g}\rightarrow\mathfrak{gl}(V)$ be a representation of $\mathfrak{g}$. Let $V^*$ be the dual space, that is, the space of linear functionals on $V$. Then we can define a representation $\rho^*:\mathfrak{g}\rightarrow\mathfrak{gl}(V^*)$ by the formula

$$\rho^*(X)=-(\rho(X))^\operatorname{tr},$$

where for any operator $A:V\rightarrow V$, the transpose operator $A^\operatorname{tr}:V^*\rightarrow V^*$ is defined as the "composition with $A$" operator:

$$(A^\operatorname{tr}\phi)(v)=\phi(Av)$$

The minus sign in the definition of $\rho^*$ is needed to ensure that $\rho^*$ is actually a representation of $\mathfrak{g}$, in light of the identity $(AB)^\operatorname{tr}=B^\operatorname{tr}A^\operatorname{tr}.$

If we work in a basis, then the transpose in the above definition can be interpreted as the ordinary matrix transpose.

=== Representation on linear maps ===
Let $V, W$ be $\mathfrak{g}$-modules, $\mathfrak{g}$ a Lie algebra. Then $\operatorname{Hom}(V, W)$ becomes a $\mathfrak{g}$-module by setting $(X \cdot f)(v) = X f(v) - f (X v)$. In particular, $\operatorname{Hom}_\mathfrak{g}(V, W) = \operatorname{Hom}(V, W)^\mathfrak{g}$; that is to say, the $\mathfrak{g}$-module homomorphisms from $V$ to $W$ are simply the elements of $\operatorname{Hom}(V, W)$ that are invariant under the just-defined action of $\mathfrak{g}$ on $\operatorname{Hom}(V, W)$. If we take $W$ to be the base field, we recover the action of $\mathfrak{g}$ on $V^*$ given in the previous subsection.

== Representation theory of semisimple Lie algebras ==
See Representation theory of semisimple Lie algebras.

== Enveloping algebras ==
To each Lie algebra $\mathfrak{g}$ over a field k, one can associate a certain ring called the universal enveloping algebra of $\mathfrak{g}$ and denoted $U(\mathfrak{g})$. The universal property of the universal enveloping algebra guarantees that every representation of $\mathfrak{g}$ gives rise to a representation of $U(\mathfrak{g})$. Conversely, the PBW theorem tells us that $\mathfrak{g}$ sits inside $U(\mathfrak{g})$, so that every representation of $U(\mathfrak{g})$ can be restricted to $\mathfrak{g}$. Thus, there is a one-to-one correspondence between representations of $\mathfrak{g}$ and those of $U(\mathfrak{g})$.

The universal enveloping algebra plays an important role in the representation theory of semisimple Lie algebras, described above. Specifically, the finite-dimensional irreducible representations are constructed as quotients of Verma modules, and Verma modules are constructed as quotients of the universal enveloping algebra.

The construction of $U(\mathfrak{g})$ is as follows. Let T be the tensor algebra of the vector space $\mathfrak{g}$. Thus, by definition, $T = \oplus_{n=0}^\infty \otimes_1^n \mathfrak{g}$ and the multiplication on it is given by $\otimes$. Let $U(\mathfrak{g})$ be the quotient ring of T by the ideal generated by elements of the form

$$[X, Y] - (X \otimes Y - Y \otimes X)$$.

There is a natural linear map from $\mathfrak{g}$ into $U(\mathfrak{g})$ obtained by restricting the quotient map of $T \to U(\mathfrak{g})$ to degree one piece. The PBW theorem implies that the canonical map is actually injective. Thus, every Lie algebra $\mathfrak{g}$ can be embedded into an associative algebra $A=U(\mathfrak{g})$in such a way that the bracket on $\mathfrak{g}$ is given by $[X,Y]=XY-YX$ in $A$.

If $\mathfrak{g}$ is abelian, then $U(\mathfrak{g})$ is the symmetric algebra of the vector space $\mathfrak{g}$.

Since $\mathfrak{g}$ is a module over itself via adjoint representation, the enveloping algebra $U(\mathfrak{g})$ becomes a $\mathfrak{g}$-module by extending the adjoint representation. But one can also use the left and right regular representation to make the enveloping algebra a $\mathfrak{g}$-module; namely, with the notation $l_X(Y) = XY, X \in \mathfrak{g}, Y \in U(\mathfrak{g})$, the mapping $X \mapsto l_X$ defines a representation of $\mathfrak{g}$ on $U(\mathfrak{g})$. The right regular representation is defined similarly.

== Induced representation ==
Let $\mathfrak{g}$ be a finite-dimensional Lie algebra over a field of characteristic zero and $\mathfrak{h} \subset \mathfrak{g}$ a subalgebra. $U(\mathfrak{h})$ acts on $U(\mathfrak{g})$ from the right and thus, for any $\mathfrak{h}$-module W, one can form the left $U(\mathfrak{g})$-module $U(\mathfrak{g}) \otimes_{U(\mathfrak{h})} W$. It is a $\mathfrak{g}$-module denoted by $\operatorname{Ind}_\mathfrak{h}^\mathfrak{g} W$ and called the $\mathfrak{g}$-module induced by W. It satisfies (and is in fact characterized by) the universal property: for any $\mathfrak{g}$-module E

$$\operatorname{Hom}_\mathfrak{g}(\operatorname{Ind}_\mathfrak{h}^\mathfrak{g} W, E) \simeq \operatorname{Hom}_\mathfrak{h}(W, \operatorname{Res}^\mathfrak{g}_\mathfrak{h} E)$$.

Furthermore, $\operatorname{Ind}_\mathfrak{h}^\mathfrak{g}$ is an exact functor from the category of $\mathfrak{h}$-modules to the category of $\mathfrak{g}$-modules. These uses the fact that $U(\mathfrak{g})$ is a free right module over $U(\mathfrak{h})$. In particular, if $\operatorname{Ind}_\mathfrak{h}^\mathfrak{g} W$ is simple (resp. absolutely simple), then W is simple (resp. absolutely simple). Here, a $\mathfrak{g}$-module V is absolutely simple if $V \otimes_k F$ is simple for any field extension $F/k$.

The induction is transitive: $\operatorname{Ind}_\mathfrak{h}^\mathfrak{g} \simeq \operatorname{Ind}_\mathfrak{h'}^\mathfrak{g} \circ \operatorname{Ind}_\mathfrak{h}^\mathfrak{h'}$ for any Lie subalgebra $\mathfrak{h'} \subset \mathfrak{g}$ and any Lie subalgebra $\mathfrak{h} \subset \mathfrak{h}'$. The induction commutes with restriction: let $\mathfrak{h} \subset \mathfrak{g}$ be subalgebra and $\mathfrak{n}$ an ideal of $\mathfrak{g}$ that is contained in $\mathfrak{h}$. Set $\mathfrak{g}_1 = \mathfrak{g}/\mathfrak{n}$ and $\mathfrak{h}_1 = \mathfrak{h}/\mathfrak{n}$. Then $\operatorname{Ind}^\mathfrak{g}_\mathfrak{h} \circ \operatorname{Res}_\mathfrak{h} \simeq \operatorname{Res}_\mathfrak{g} \circ \operatorname{Ind}^\mathfrak{g_1}_\mathfrak{h_1}$.

== Infinite-dimensional representations and "category O" ==
Let $\mathfrak{g}$ be a finite-dimensional semisimple Lie algebra over a field of characteristic zero. (in the solvable or nilpotent case, one studies primitive ideals of the enveloping algebra; cf. Dixmier for the definitive account.)

The category of (possibly infinite-dimensional) modules over $\mathfrak{g}$ turns out to be too large especially for homological algebra methods to be useful: it was realized that a smaller subcategory category O is a better place for the representation theory in the semisimple case in zero characteristic. For instance, the category O turned out to be of a right size to formulate the celebrated BGG reciprocity.

== (g,K)-module ==
One of the most important applications of Lie algebra representations is to the representation theory of real reductive Lie groups. The application is based on the idea that if $\pi$ is a Hilbert-space representation of, say, a connected real semisimple linear Lie group G, then it has two natural actions: the complexification $\mathfrak{g}$ and the connected maximal compact subgroup K. The $\mathfrak{g}$-module structure of $\pi$ allows algebraic especially homological methods to be applied and $K$-module structure allows harmonic analysis to be carried out in a way similar to that on connected compact semisimple Lie groups.

== Representation on an algebra ==
If we have a Lie superalgebra L, then a representation of L on an algebra is a (not necessarily associative) Z_{2} graded algebra A which is a representation of L as a Z_{2} graded vector space and in addition, the elements of L acts as derivations/antiderivations on A.

More specifically, if H is a pure element of L and x and y are pure elements of A,

H[xy] = (H[x])y + (−1)^{xH}x(H[y])

Also, if A is unital, then

H[1] = 0

Now, for the case of a representation of a Lie algebra, we simply drop all the gradings and the (−1) to the some power factors.

A Lie (super)algebra is an algebra and it has an adjoint representation of itself. This is a representation on an algebra: the (anti)derivation property is the superJacobi identity.

If a vector space is both an associative algebra and a Lie algebra and the adjoint representation of the Lie algebra on itself is a representation on an algebra (i.e., acts by derivations on the associative algebra structure), then it is a Poisson algebra. The analogous observation for Lie superalgebras gives the notion of a Poisson superalgebra.

== See also ==
- Representation of a Lie group
- Weight (representation theory)
- Weyl's theorem on complete reducibility
- Root system
- Weyl character formula
- Representation theory of a connected compact Lie group
- Whitehead's lemma (Lie algebras)
- Kazhdan–Lusztig conjectures
- Quillen's lemma - analog of Schur's lemma
