= Glossary of Lie groups and Lie algebras =

This is a glossary for the terminology applied in the mathematical theories of Lie groups and Lie algebras. For the topics in the representation theory of Lie groups and Lie algebras, see Glossary of representation theory. Because of the lack of other options, the glossary also includes some generalizations such as quantum group.

Notations:

- Throughout the glossary, $( \cdot, \cdot )$ denotes the inner product of a Euclidean space E and $\langle \cdot, \cdot \rangle$ denotes the rescaled inner product

$$\langle \beta, \alpha \rangle = \frac{(\beta, \alpha)}{(\alpha, \alpha)} \, \forall \alpha, \beta \in E.$$

== A ==
abelian
1. An abelian Lie group is a Lie group that is an abelian group.
2. An abelian Lie algebra is a Lie algebra such that $[x, y] = 0$ for every $x, y$ in the algebra.
adjoint
1. An adjoint representation of a Lie group:

$$\operatorname{Ad} : G \to \operatorname{GL}(\mathfrak g)$$

such that $\operatorname{Ad}(g)$ is the differential at the identity element of the conjugation $c_g : G \to G, x \mapsto g x g^{-1}$.

2. An adjoint representation of a Lie algebra is a Lie algebra representation

$\textrm{ad}: \mathfrak{g} \to \mathfrak{gl}(\mathfrak{g})$ where $\textrm{ad}(x)y = [x, y]$.

Ado
Ado's theorem: Any finite-dimensional Lie algebra is isomorphic to a subalgebra of $\mathfrak{gl}_V$ for some finite-dimensional vector space V.
affine
1. An affine Lie algebra is a particular type of Kac–Moody algebra.
2. An affine Weyl group.
analytic
1. An analytic subgroup
automorphism
1. An automorphism of a Lie algebra is a linear automorphism preserving the bracket.

== B ==
B
1. (B, N) pair
Borel
1. Armand Borel (1923 – 2003), a Swiss mathematician
2. A Borel subgroup.
3. A Borel subalgebra is a maximal solvable subalgebra.
4. Borel-Bott-Weil theorem
Bruhat
1. Bruhat decomposition

== C ==
Cartan
1. Élie Cartan (1869 – 1951), a French mathematician
2. A Cartan subalgebra $\mathfrak{h}$ of a Lie algebra $\mathfrak{g}$ is a nilpotent subalgebra satisfying $N_\mathfrak{g}(\mathfrak{h}) = \mathfrak{h}$.
3. Cartan criterion for solvability: A Lie algebra $\mathfrak{g}$ is solvable iff $\kappa( \mathfrak{g}, [\mathfrak{g},\mathfrak{g}] ) = 0$.
4. Cartan criterion for semisimplicity: (1) If $\kappa( \cdot, \cdot)$ is nondegenerate, then $\mathfrak{g}$ is semisimple. (2) If $\mathfrak{g}$ is semisimple and the underlying field $F$ has characteristic 0 , then $\kappa( \cdot, \cdot)$ is nondegenerate.
5. The Cartan matrix of the root system $\Phi$ is the matrix $( \langle \alpha_i , \alpha_j \rangle )_{i,j=1}^n$, where $\Delta = \{\alpha_1 \ldots \alpha_n\}$ is a set of simple roots of $\Phi$.
6. Cartan subgroup
7. Cartan decomposition
Casimir
Casimir invariant, a distinguished element of a universal enveloping algebra.
Clebsch–Gordan coefficients
Clebsch–Gordan coefficients
center
2. The centralizer of a subset $X$ of a Lie algebra $\mathfrak{g}$ is $C_{\mathfrak{g}}(X) := \{x \in \mathfrak{g} | [x, X] = \{0\} \}$.
center
1. The center of a Lie group is the center of the group.
2. The center of a Lie algebra is the centralizer of itself : $Z(L) := \{x \in \mathfrak{g} | [x, \mathfrak{g}] = 0 \}$
central series
1. A descending central series (or lower central series) is a sequence of ideals of a Lie algebra $L$ defined by $C^0(L) = L , \, C^1(L) = [L,L] , \, C^{n+1}(L) = [L, C^n(L)]$
2. An ascending central series (or upper central series) is a sequence of ideals of a Lie algebra $L$ defined by $C_0(L) = \{0\} , \, C_1(L) = Z(L)$ (center of L) , $C_{n+1}(L) = \pi_n^{-1} ( Z ( L / C_{n}(L) ) )$, where $\pi_i$ is the natural homomorphism $L \to L/C_n(L)$
Chevalley
1. Claude Chevalley (1909 – 1984), a French mathematician
2. A Chevalley basis is a basis constructed by Claude Chevalley with the property that all structure constants are integers. Chevalley used these bases to construct analogues of Lie groups over finite fields, called Chevalley groups.
complex reflection group
complex reflection group
coroot
coroot
Coxeter
1. H. S. M. Coxeter (1907 – 2003), a British-born Canadian geometer
2. Coxeter group
3. Coxeter number

== D ==
derived algebra
1. The derived algebra of a Lie algebra $\mathfrak{g}$ is $[\mathfrak{g}, \mathfrak{g} ]$. It is a subalgebra (in fact an ideal).
2. A derived series is a sequence of ideals of a Lie algebra $\mathfrak g$ obtained by repeatedly taking derived algebras; i.e., $D^0 \mathfrak{g} = \mathfrak{g}, D^n \mathfrak{g} = D^{n-1}\mathfrak{g}$.
Dynkin
1. Eugene Borisovich Dynkin (1924 – 2014), a Soviet and American mathematician
2.

Dynkin diagrams

Dynkin diagrams.

== E ==
extension
An exact sequence $0 \to \mathfrak{g}' \to \mathfrak{g} \to \mathfrak{g}'' \to 0$ or $\mathfrak{g}$ is called a Lie algebra extension of $\mathfrak{g}''$ by $\mathfrak{g}'$.
exponential map
The exponential map for a Lie group G with $\mathfrak g$ is a map $\mathfrak g \to G$ which is not necessarily a homomorphism but satisfies a certain universal property.
exponential
E6, E7, E7½, E8, En, Exceptional Lie algebra

== F ==
free Lie algebra
F
F4
fundamental
For "fundamental Weyl chamber", see Weyl.

== G ==
G
G2
generalized
1. For "Generalized Cartan matrix", see Cartan.
2. For "Generalized Kac–Moody algebra", see Kac–Moody algebra.
3. For "Generalized Verma module", see Verma.
group
Group analysis of differential equations.

== H ==
homomorphism
1. A Lie group homomorphism is a group homomorphism that is also a smooth map.
2. A Lie algebra homomorphism is a linear map $\phi : \mathfrak{g}_1 \to \mathfrak{g}_2$ such that $\phi([x,y]) = [ \phi(x), \phi(y) ] \, \forall x,y \in \mathfrak{g}_1.$
Harish-Chandra
1. Harish-Chandra, (1923 – 1983), an Indian American mathematician and physicist
2. Harish-Chandra homomorphism
3. Harish-Chandra isomorphism
highest
1. The theorem of the highest weight, stating the highest weights classify the irreducible representations.
2. highest weight
3. highest weight module

== I ==
ideal
An ideal of a Lie algebra $\mathfrak{g}$ is a subspace $\mathfrak{g'}$ such that $[\mathfrak{g'}, \mathfrak{g}] \subseteq \mathfrak{g'}.$ Unlike in ring theory, there is no distinguishability of left ideal and right ideal.
index
Index of a Lie algebra
invariant convex cone
An invariant convex cone is a closed convex cone in the Lie algebra of a connected Lie group that is invariant under inner automorphisms.
Iwasawa decomposition
Iwasawa decomposition

== J ==
Jacobi identity
1.

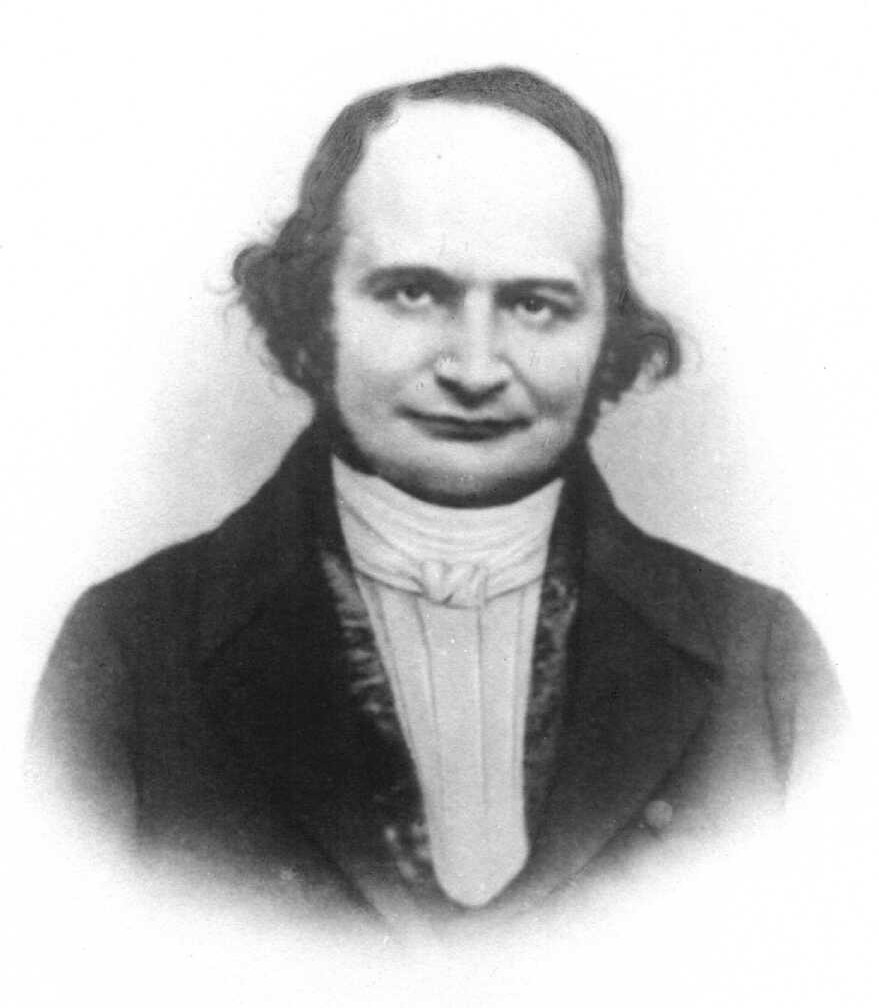
Carl Gustav Jacob Jacobi

Carl Gustav Jacob Jacobi (1804 – 1851), a German mathematician.
2. Given a binary operation $[\cdot,\,\cdot ] : V^2 \to V$, the Jacobi identity states: [[x, y], z] + [[y, z], x] + [[z, x], y] = 0.

== K ==
Kac–Moody algebra
Kac–Moody algebra
Killing
1. Wilhelm Killing (1847 – 1923), a German mathematician.
2. The Killing form on a Lie algebra $\mathfrak{g}$ is a symmetric, associative, bilinear form defined by $\kappa(x, y) := \textrm{Tr}( \textrm{ad}\,x\, \textrm{ad}\, y )\ \forall x,y \in \mathfrak{g}$.
Kirillov
Kirillov character formula

== L ==
Langlands
Langlands decomposition
Langlands dual
Lie
1.

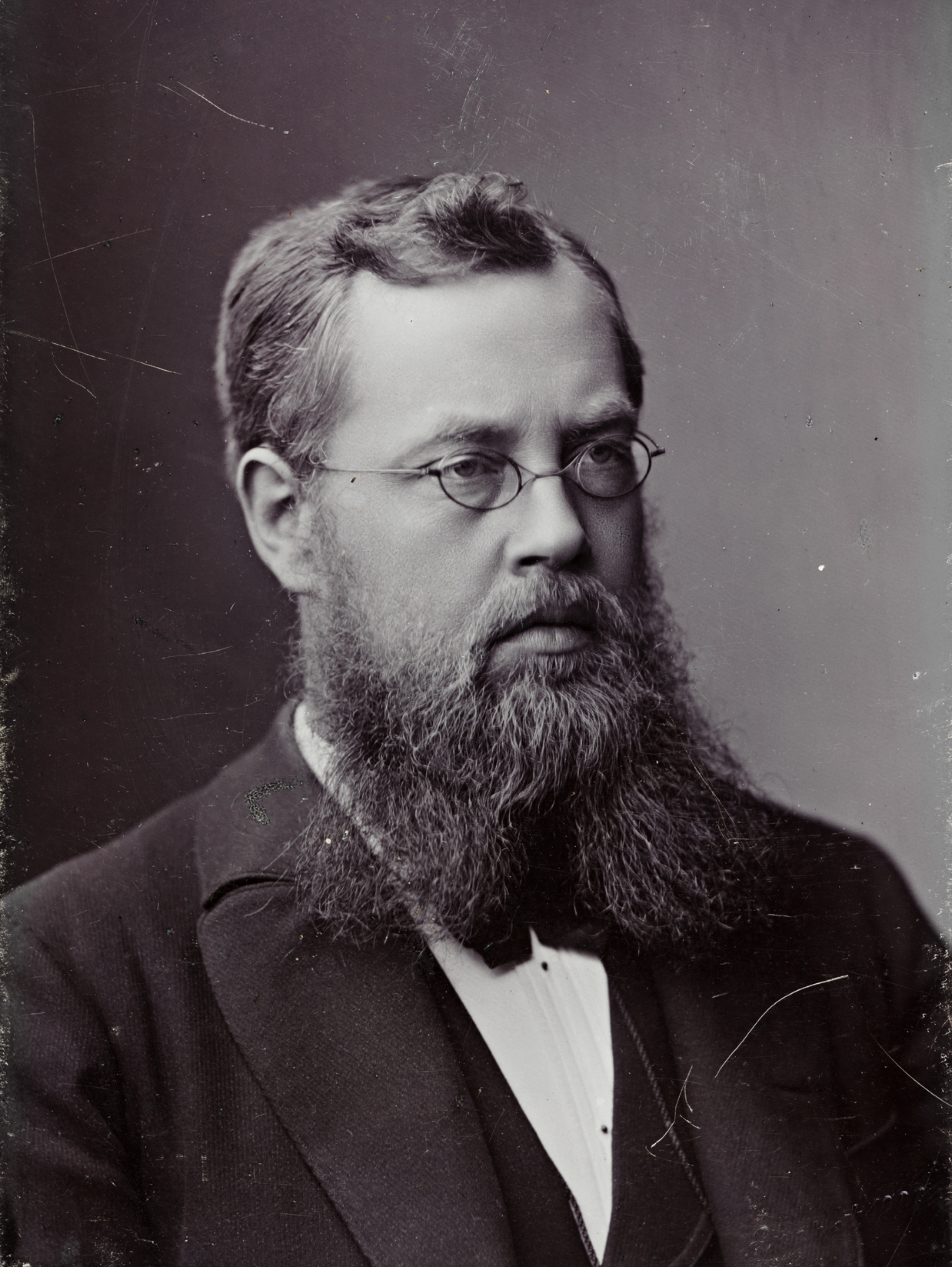
Sophus Lie

Sophus Lie (1842 – 1899), a Norwegian mathematician
2. A Lie group is a group that has a compatible structure of a smooth manifold.
3. A Lie algebra is a vector space $\mathfrak{g}$ over a field $F$ with a binary operation [·, ·] (called the Lie bracket or abbr. bracket) , which satisfies the following conditions: $\forall a,b \in F, x,y,z \in \mathfrak{g}$,

1. $[ax+by,z] = a[x,z] + b[y,z]$ (bilinearity)
2. $[x,x] = 0$ (alternating)
3. $[[x,y], z ] + [[y,z],x] + [[z,x],y] = 0$ (Jacobi identity)

4. Lie group–Lie algebra correspondence
5. Lie's theorem

Let $\mathfrak{g}$ be a finite-dimensional complex solvable Lie algebra over algebraically closed field of characteristic $0$, and let $V$ be a nonzero finite dimensional representation of $\mathfrak{g}$. Then there exists an element of $V$ which is a simultaneous eigenvector for all elements of $\mathfrak{g}$.

6. Compact Lie group.
7. Semisimple Lie group; see semisimple.
Levi
Levi decomposition

== N ==
nilpotent
1. A nilpotent Lie group.
2. A nilpotent Lie algebra is a Lie algebra that is nilpotent as an ideal; i.e., some power is zero: $[\mathfrak g, [\mathfrak g, [\mathfrak g, \dots, [\mathfrak g, \mathfrak g] \dots ]]] = 0$.
3. A nilpotent element of a semisimple Lie algebra is an element x such that the adjoint endomorphism $ad_x$ is a nilpotent endomorphism.
4. A nilpotent cone
normalizer
The normalizer of a subspace $K$ of a Lie algebra $\mathfrak{g}$ is $N_{\mathfrak{g}}(K) := \{x \in \mathfrak{g} | [x, K] \subseteq K \}$.

== M ==
maximal
1. For "maximal compact subgroup", see compact.
2. For "maximal torus", see torus.

== P ==
parabolic
1. Parabolic subgroup
2. Parabolic subalgebra.
positive
For "positive root", see positive.

== Q ==
quantum
quantum group.
quantized
quantized enveloping algebra.

== R ==
radical
1. The radical of a Lie group.
2. The radical of a Lie algebra $\mathfrak g$ is the largest (i.e., unique maximal) solvable ideal of $\mathfrak{g}$.
real
real form.
reductive
1. A reductive group.
2. A reductive Lie algebra.
reflection
A reflection group, a group generated by reflections.
regular
1. A regular element of a Lie algebra.
2. A regular element with respect to a root system.

Let $\Phi$ be a root system. $\gamma \in E$ is called regular if $(\gamma, \alpha) \ne 0 \, \forall \gamma \in \Phi$.
For each set of simple roots $\Delta$ of $\Phi$, there exists a regular element $\gamma \in E$ such that $( \gamma, \alpha ) > 0 \, \forall \gamma \in \Delta$, conversely for each regular $\gamma$ there exist a unique set of base roots $\Delta(\gamma)$ such that the previous condition holds for $\Delta = \Delta(\gamma)$. It can be determined in following way: let $\Phi^+(\gamma) = \{\alpha \in \Phi | (\alpha, \gamma) > 0\}$. Call an element $\alpha$ of $\Phi^+(\gamma)$ decomposable if $\alpha = \alpha' + \alpha''$ where $\alpha', \alpha'' \in \Phi^+(\gamma)$, then $\Delta(\gamma)$ is the set of all indecomposable elements of $\Phi^+(\gamma)$

root
1. root of a semisimple Lie algebra:

Let $\mathfrak{g}$ be a semisimple Lie algebra, $\mathfrak{h}$ be a Cartan subalgebra of $\mathfrak{g}$. For $\alpha \in \mathfrak{h}^*$, let $\mathfrak{g_\alpha} := \{ x \in \mathfrak{g} | [h,x] = \alpha(h) x \, \forall h \in \mathfrak{h} \}$. $\alpha$ is called a root of $\mathfrak{g}$ if it is nonzero and $\mathfrak{g_\alpha} \ne \{0\}$
The set of all roots is denoted by $\Phi$ ; it forms a root system.

2. Root system

A subset $\Phi$ of the Euclidean space $E$ is called a root system if it satisfies the following conditions:
- $\Phi$ is finite, $\textrm{span} (\Phi) = E$ and $0 \notin \Phi$.
- For all $\alpha \in \Phi$ and $c \in \mathbb{R}$, $c \alpha \in \Phi$ iff $c = \pm 1$.
- For all $\alpha,\beta \in \Phi$, $\langle \alpha, \beta \rangle$ is an integer.
- For all $\alpha,\beta \in \Phi$, $S_\alpha(\beta)\in \Phi$, where $S_\alpha$ is the reflection through the hyperplane normal to $\alpha$, i.e. $S_\alpha(x) = x - \langle x , \alpha \rangle \alpha$.

3. Root datum
4. Positive root of root system $\Phi$ with respect to a set of simple roots $\Delta$ is a root of $\Phi$ which is a linear combination of elements of $\Delta$ with nonnegative coefficients.
5. Negative root of root system $\Phi$ with respect to a set of simple roots $\Delta$ is a root of $\Phi$ which is a linear combination of elements of $\Delta$ with nonpositive coefficients.
6. long root
7. short root
8. inverse of a root system: Given a root system $\Phi$. Define $\alpha^v = \frac{2 \alpha}{ ( \alpha, \alpha) }$, $\Phi^v = \{ \alpha^v | \alpha \in \Phi \}$ is called the inverse of a root system.

$\Phi^v$ is again a root system and have the identical Weyl group as $\Phi$.

9. base of a root system: synonymous to "set of simple roots"
10. dual of a root system: synonymous to "inverse of a root system"

== S ==
Serre
Serre's theorem states that, given a (finite reduced) root system $\Phi$, there exists a unique (up to a choice of a base) semisimple Lie algebra whose root system is $\Phi$.
simple
1. A simple Lie group is a connected Lie group that is not abelian which does not have nontrivial connected normal subgroups.
2. A simple Lie algebra is a Lie algebra that is non abelian and has only two ideals, itself and $\{0\}$.
3. simply laced group (a simple Lie group is simply laced when its Dynkin diagram is without multiple edges).
4. simple root. A subset $\Delta$ of a root system $\Phi$ is called a set of simple roots if it satisfies the following conditions:

- $\Delta$ is a linear basis of $E$.
- Each element of $\Phi$ is a linear combination of elements of $\Delta$ with coefficients that are either all nonnegative or all nonpositive.

5. Classification of simple Lie algebras
Classical Lie algebras:

Special linear algebra	$A_l \ (l \ge 1)$	$l^2 + 2l$	$\mathfrak{sl}(l+1, F) = \{ x \in \mathfrak{gl}(l+1,F) | Tr(x) = 0 \}$ (traceless matrices)
Orthogonal algebra	$B_l \ (l \ge 1)$	$2 l^2 + l$	$$\mathfrak{o}(2l+1, F) = \{ x \in \mathfrak{gl}(2l+1,F) | s x = - x^t s , s = \begin{pmatrix}   1 & 0 & 0 \\ 0 & 0 & I_l \\ 0 & I_l & 0  \end{pmatrix}\}$$
Symplectic algebra	$C_l \ (l \ge 2)$	$2 l^2 - l$	$$\mathfrak{sp}(2l, F) = \{ x \in \mathfrak{gl}(2l,F) | s x = - x^t s, s = \begin{pmatrix}   0 & I_l \\  -I_l & 0  \end{pmatrix}\}$$
Orthogonal algebra	$D_l (l \ge 1)$	$2 l^2 + l$	$$\mathfrak{o}(2l, F) = \{ x \in \mathfrak{gl}(2l,F) | s x = - x^t s, s = \begin{pmatrix}   0 & I_l \\   I_l & 0  \end{pmatrix}\}$$

Exceptional Lie algebras:

Root System	dimension
G_{2}	14
F_{4}	52
E_{6}	78
E_{7}	133
E_{8}	248

semisimple
1. A semisimple Lie group
2. A semisimple Lie algebra is a nonzero Lie algebra that has no nonzero abelian ideal.
3. In a semisimple Lie algebra, an element is semisimple if its image under the adjoint representation is semisimple; see Semisimple Lie algebra#Jordan decomposition.
solvable
1. A solvable Lie group
2. A solvable Lie algebra is a Lie algebra $\mathfrak g$ such that $D^n \mathfrak g = 0$ for some $n \ge 0$; where $D \mathfrak g = [\mathfrak g, \mathfrak g]$ denotes the derived algebra of $\mathfrak g$.
split
Stiefel
Stiefel diagram of a compact connected Lie group.
subalgebra
A subspace $\mathfrak{g'}$ of a Lie algebra $\mathfrak{g}$ is called the subalgebra of $\mathfrak{g}$ if it is closed under bracket, i.e. $[\mathfrak{g'}, \mathfrak{g'}] \subseteq \mathfrak{g'}.$

== T ==
Tits
Tits cone.
toral
1. toral Lie algebra
2. maximal toral subalgebra

== U ==
- Unitarian trick

== V ==
- Verma module

== W ==
Weyl
1. Hermann Weyl (1885 – 1955), a German mathematician
2. A Weyl chamber is one of the connected components of the complement in V, a real vector space on which a root system is defined, when the hyperplanes orthogonal to the root vectors are removed.
3. The Weyl character formula gives in closed form the characters of the irreducible complex representations of the simple Lie groups.
4. Weyl group: Weyl group of a root system $\Phi$ is a (necessarily finite) group of orthogonal linear transformations of $E$ which is generated by reflections through hyperplanes normal to roots of $\Phi$
