= Glossary of group theory =

A group is a set together with an associative operation that admits an identity element and such that there exists an inverse for every element.

Throughout this glossary, we use e to denote the identity element of a group.

== A ==
abelian group
A group (G, •) is abelian if • is commutative, i.e. g • h = h • g for all g, h ∈ G. Likewise, a group is nonabelian if this relation fails to hold for any pair g, h ∈ G.
ascendant subgroup
A subgroup H of a group G is ascendant if there is an ascending subgroup series starting from H and ending at G, such that every term in the series is a normal subgroup of its successor. The series may be infinite. If the series is finite, then the subgroup is subnormal.
automorphism
An automorphism of a group is an isomorphism of the group to itself.

== C ==
center of a group
The center of a group G, denoted Z(G), is the set of those group elements that commute with all elements of G, that is, the set of all h ∈ G such that hg = gh for all g ∈ G. Z(G) is always a normal subgroup of G. A group G is abelian if and only if Z(G) = G.
centerless group
A group G is centerless if its center Z(G) is trivial.
central subgroup
A subgroup of a group is a central subgroup of that group if it lies inside the center of the group.
centralizer
For a subset S of a group G, the centralizer of S in G, denoted C_{G}(S), is the subgroup of G defined by

$$\mathrm{C}_G(S)=\{ g \in G \mid gs=sg \text{ for all } s \in S\}.$$

characteristic subgroup
A subgroup of a group is a characteristic subgroup of that group if it is mapped to itself by every automorphism of the parent group.
characteristically simple group
A group is said to be characteristically simple if it has no proper nontrivial characteristic subgroups.
class function
A class function on a group G is a function that it is constant on the conjugacy classes of G.
class number
The class number of a group is the number of its conjugacy classes.
commutator
The commutator of two elements g and h of a group G is the element [g, h] = g^{−1}h^{−1}gh. Some authors define the commutator as [g, h] = ghg^{−1}h^{−1} instead. The commutator of two elements g and h is equal to the group's identity if and only if g and h commutate, that is, if and only if gh = hg.
commutator subgroup
The commutator subgroup or derived subgroup of a group is the subgroup generated by all the commutators of the group.
complete group
A group G is said to be complete if it is centerless and if every automorphism of G is an inner automorphism.
composition series
A composition series of a group G is a subnormal series of finite length

$$1 = H_0\triangleleft H_1\triangleleft \cdots \triangleleft H_n = G,$$

with strict inclusions, such that each H_{i} is a maximal strict normal subgroup of H_{i+1}. Equivalently, a composition series is a subnormal series such that each factor group H_{i+1} / H_{i} is simple. The factor groups are called composition factors.
conjugacy-closed subgroup
A subgroup of a group is said to be conjugacy-closed if any two elements of the subgroup that are conjugate in the group are also conjugate in the subgroup.
conjugacy class
The conjugacy classes of a group G are those subsets of G containing group elements that are conjugate with each other.
conjugate elements
Two elements x and y of a group G are conjugate if there exists an element g ∈ G such that g^{−1}xg = y. The element g^{−1}xg, denoted x^{g}, is called the conjugate of x by g. Some authors define the conjugate of x by g as gxg^{−1}. This is often denoted ^{g}x. Conjugacy is an equivalence relation. Its equivalence classes are called conjugacy classes.
conjugate subgroups
Two subgroups H_{1} and H_{2} of a group G are conjugate subgroups if there is a g ∈ G such that gH_{1}g^{−1} = H_{2}.
contranormal subgroup
A subgroup of a group G is a contranormal subgroup of G if its normal closure is G itself.
cyclic group
A cyclic group is a group that is generated by a single element, that is, a group such that there is an element g in the group such that every other element of the group may be obtained by repeatedly applying the group operation to g or its inverse.

== D ==
derived subgroup
Synonym for commutator subgroup.
direct product
The direct product of two groups G and H, denoted G × H, is the cartesian product of the underlying sets of G and H, equipped with a component-wise defined binary operation (g_{1}, h_{1}) · (g_{2}, h_{2}) = (g_{1} ⋅ g_{2}, h_{1} ⋅ h_{2}). With this operation, G × H itself forms a group.

== E ==
exponent of a group
The exponent of a group G is the smallest positive integer n such that g^{n} = e for all g ∈ G. It is the least common multiple of the orders of all elements in the group. If no such positive integer exists, the exponent of the group is said to be infinite.

== F ==
factor group
Synonym for quotient group.
FC-group
A group is an FC-group if every conjugacy class of its elements has finite cardinality.
finite group
A finite group is a group of finite order, that is, a group with a finite number of elements.
finitely generated group
A group G is finitely generated if there is a finite generating set, that is, if there is a finite set S of elements of G such that every element of G can be written as the combination of finitely many elements of S and of inverses of elements of S.

== G ==
generating set
A generating set of a group G is a subset S of G such that every element of G can be expressed as a combination (under the group operation) of finitely many elements of S and inverses of elements of S. Given a subset S of G. We denote by ⟨S⟩ the smallest subgroup of G containing S. ⟨S⟩ is called the subgroup of G generated by S.
group automorphism
See automorphism.
group homomorphism
See homomorphism.
group isomorphism
See isomorphism.

== H ==
homomorphism
Given two groups (G, •) and (H, ·), a homomorphism from G to H is a function h : G → H such that for all a and b in G, h(a • b) = h(a) · h(b).

== I ==
index of a subgroup
The index of a subgroup H of a group G, denoted |G : H| or [G : H] or (G : H), is the number of cosets of H in G. For a normal subgroup N of a group G, the index of N in G is equal to the order of the quotient group G / N. For a finite subgroup H of a finite group G, the index of H in G is equal to the quotient of the orders of G and H.
isomorphism
Given two groups (G, •) and (H, ·), an isomorphism between G and H is a bijective homomorphism from G to H, that is, a one-to-one correspondence between the elements of the groups in a way that respects the given group operations. Two groups are isomorphic if there exists a group isomorphism mapping from one to the other. Isomorphic groups can be thought of as essentially the same, only with different labels on the individual elements.

== L ==
lattice of subgroups
The lattice of subgroups of a group is the lattice defined by its subgroups, partially ordered by set inclusion.
locally cyclic group
A group is locally cyclic if every finitely generated subgroup is cyclic. Every cyclic group is locally cyclic, and every finitely-generated locally cyclic group is cyclic. Every locally cyclic group is abelian. Every subgroup, every quotient group and every homomorphic image of a locally cyclic group is locally cyclic.

== N ==
no small subgroup
A topological group has no small subgroup if there exists a neighborhood of the identity element that does not contain any nontrivial subgroup.
normal closure
The normal closure of a subset S of a group G is the intersection of all normal subgroups of G that contain S.
normal core
The normal core of a subgroup H of a group G is the largest normal subgroup of G that is contained in H.
normal series
A normal series of a group G is a sequence of normal subgroups of G such that each element of the sequence is a normal subgroup of the next element:

$$1 = A_0\triangleleft A_1\triangleleft \cdots \triangleleft A_n = G$$

with

$$A_i\triangleleft G$$.

normal subgroup
A subgroup N of a group G is normal in G (denoted N ◅ G) if the conjugation of an element n of N by an element g of G is always in N, that is, if for all g ∈ G and n ∈ N, gng^{−1} ∈ N. A normal subgroup N of a group G can be used to construct the quotient group G / N.
normalizer
For a subset S of a group G, the normalizer of S in G, denoted N_{G}(S), is the subgroup of G defined by

$$\mathrm{N}_G(S)=\{ g \in G \mid gS=Sg \}.$$

== O ==
orbit
Consider a group G acting on a set X. The orbit of an element x in X is the set of elements in X to which x can be moved by the elements of G. The orbit of x is denoted by G ⋅ x
order of a group
The order of a group (G, •) is the cardinality (i.e. number of elements) of G. A group with finite order is called a finite group.
order of a group element
The order of an element g of a group G is the smallest positive integer n such that g^{n} = e. If no such integer exists, then the order of g is said to be infinite. The order of a finite group is divisible by the order of every element.

== P ==
perfect core
The perfect core of a group is its largest perfect subgroup.
perfect group
A perfect group is a group that is equal to its own commutator subgroup.
periodic group
A group is periodic if every group element has finite order. Every finite group is periodic.
permutation group
A permutation group is a group whose elements are permutations of a given set M (the bijective functions from set M to itself) and whose group operation is the composition of those permutations. The group consisting of all permutations of a set M is the symmetric group of M.
p-group
If p is a prime number, then a p-group is one in which the order of every element is a power of p. A finite group is a p-group if and only if the order of the group is a power of p.
p-subgroup
A subgroup that is also a p-group. The study of p-subgroups is the central object of the Sylow theorems.

== Q ==
quotient group
Given a group G and a normal subgroup N of G, the quotient group is the set G / N of left cosets {aN : a ∈ G} together with the operation aN • bN = abN. The relationship between normal subgroups, homomorphisms, and factor groups is summed up in the fundamental theorem on homomorphisms.

== R ==
real element
An element g of a group G is called a real element of G if it belongs to the same conjugacy class as its inverse, that is, if there is a h in G with g^{h} = g^{−1}, where g^{h} is defined as h^{−1}gh. An element of a group G is real if and only if for all representations of G the trace of the corresponding matrix is a real number.

== S ==
serial subgroup
A subgroup H of a group G is a serial subgroup of G if there is a chain C of subgroups of G from H to G such that for each pair of consecutive subgroups X and Y in C, X is a normal subgroup of Y. If the chain is finite, then H is a subnormal subgroup of G.
simple group
A simple group is a nontrivial group whose only normal subgroups are the trivial group and the group itself.
subgroup
A subgroup of a group G is a subset H of the elements of G that itself forms a group when equipped with the restriction of the group operation of G to H × H. A subset H of a group G is a subgroup of G if and only if it is nonempty and closed under products and inverses, that is, if and only if for every a and b in H, ab and a^{−1} are also in H.
subgroup series
A subgroup series of a group G is a sequence of subgroups of G such that each element in the series is a subgroup of the next element:

$$1 = A_0 \leq A_1 \leq \cdots \leq A_n = G.$$

subnormal subgroup
A subgroup H of a group G is a subnormal subgroup of G if there is a finite chain of subgroups of the group, each one normal in the next, beginning at H and ending at G.
symmetric group
Given a set M, the symmetric group of M is the set of all permutations of M (the set all bijective functions from M to M) with the composition of the permutations as group operation. The symmetric group of a finite set of size n is denoted S_{n}. (The symmetric groups of any two sets of the same size are isomorphic.)

== T ==
torsion group
Synonym for periodic group.
transitively normal subgroup
A subgroup of a group is said to be transitively normal in the group if every normal subgroup of the subgroup is also normal in the whole group.
trivial group
A trivial group is a group consisting of a single element, namely the identity element of the group. All such groups are isomorphic, and one often speaks of the trivial group.

== Basic definitions ==
Both subgroups and normal subgroups of a given group form a complete lattice under inclusion of subsets; this property and some related results are described by the lattice theorem.

Kernel of a group homomorphism. It is the preimage of the identity in the codomain of a group homomorphism. Every normal subgroup is the kernel of a group homomorphism and vice versa.

Direct product, direct sum, and semidirect product of groups. These are ways of combining groups to construct new groups; please refer to the corresponding links for explanation.

== Types of groups ==
Finitely generated group. If there exists a finite set S such that ⟨S⟩ = G, then G is said to be finitely generated. If S can be taken to have just one element, G is a cyclic group of finite order, an infinite cyclic group, or possibly a group {e} with just one element.

Simple group. Simple groups are those groups having only e and themselves as normal subgroups. The name is misleading because a simple group can in fact be very complex. An example is the monster group, whose order is about 10^{54}. Every finite group is built up from simple groups via group extensions, so the study of finite simple groups is central to the study of all finite groups. The finite simple groups are known and classified.

The structure of any finite abelian group is relatively simple; every finite abelian group is the direct sum of cyclic p-groups. This can be extended to a complete classification of all finitely generated abelian groups, that is all abelian groups that are generated by a finite set.

The situation is much more complicated for the non-abelian groups.

Free group. Given any set A, one can define a group as the smallest group containing the free semigroup of A. The group consists of the finite strings (words) that can be composed by elements from A, together with other elements that are necessary to form a group. Multiplication of strings is defined by concatenation, for instance (abb) • (bca) = abbbca.

Every group (G, •) is basically a factor group of a free group generated by G. Refer to Presentation of a group for more explanation. One can then ask algorithmic questions about these presentations, such as:

- Do these two presentations specify isomorphic groups?; or
- Does this presentation specify the trivial group?

The general case of this is the word problem, and several of these questions are in fact unsolvable by any general algorithm.

General linear group, denoted by GL(n, F), is the group of n-by-n invertible matrices, where the elements of the matrices are taken from a field F such as the real numbers or the complex numbers.

Group representation (not to be confused with the presentation of a group). A group representation is a homomorphism from a group to a general linear group. One basically tries to "represent" a given abstract group as a concrete group of invertible matrices, which is much easier to study.

== See also ==
- Glossary of Lie groups and Lie algebras
- Glossary of ring theory
- Composition series
- Normal series
