= Principal subalgebra =

In mathematics, a principal subalgebra of a complex simple Lie algebra is a 3-dimensional simple subalgebra whose non-zero elements are regular.

A finite-dimensional complex simple Lie algebra has a unique conjugacy class of principal subalgebras, each of which is the span of an sl_{2}-triple.
