= Sl2-triple =

In the theory of Lie algebras, an sl_{2}-triple is a triple of elements of a Lie algebra that satisfy the commutation relations between the standard generators of the special linear Lie algebra sl_{2}. This notion plays an important role in the theory of semisimple Lie algebras, especially in regard to their nilpotent orbits.

== Definition ==
Elements {e,h,f} of a Lie algebra g form an sl_{2}-triple if

$$[h,e] = 2e, \quad [h,f] = -2f, \quad [e,f] = h.$$

These commutation relations are satisfied by the generators

$$h = \begin{bmatrix}
1 & 0\\
0 & -1
\end{bmatrix}, \quad
e = \begin{bmatrix}
0 & 1\\
0 & 0
\end{bmatrix}, \quad
f = \begin{bmatrix}
0 & 0\\
1 & 0
\end{bmatrix}$$

of the Lie algebra sl_{2} of 2 by 2 matrices with zero trace. It follows that sl_{2}-triples in g are in a bijective correspondence with the Lie algebra homomorphisms from sl_{2} into g.

The alternative notation for the elements of an sl_{2}-triple is {H, X, Y}, with H corresponding to h, X corresponding to e, and Y corresponding to f. H is called a neutral, X is called a nilpositive, and Y is called a nilnegative.

== Properties ==
Assume that g is a finite dimensional Lie algebra over a field of characteristic zero. From the representation theory of the Lie algebra sl_{2}, one concludes that the Lie algebra g decomposes into a direct sum of finite-dimensional subspaces, each of which is isomorphic to V_{j}, the (j + 1)-dimensional simple sl_{2}-module with highest weight j. The element h of the sl_{2}-triple is semisimple, with the simple eigenvalues j, j − 2, ..., −j on a submodule of g isomorphic to V_{j} . The elements e and f move between different eigenspaces of h, increasing the eigenvalue by 2 in case of e and decreasing it by 2 in case of f. In particular, e and f are nilpotent elements of the Lie algebra g.

Conversely, the Jacobson–Morozov theorem states that any nilpotent element e of a semisimple Lie algebra g can be included into an sl_{2}-triple {e,h,f}, and all such triples are conjugate under the action of the group Z_{G}(e), the centralizer of e in the adjoint Lie group G corresponding to the Lie algebra g.

The semisimple element h of any sl_{2}-triple containing a given nilpotent element e of g is called a characteristic of e.

An sl_{2}-triple defines a grading on g according to the eigenvalues of h:

$$g = \bigoplus_{j\in\mathbb{Z}} g_j,\quad [h, a]= ja {\ \ }\textrm{ for } {\ \ } a\in g_j.$$

The sl_{2}-triple is called even if only even j occur in this decomposition, and odd otherwise.

If g is a semisimple Lie algebra, then g_{0} is a reductive Lie subalgebra of g (it is not semisimple in general). Moreover, the direct sum of the eigenspaces of h with non-negative eigenvalues is a parabolic subalgebra of g with the Levi component g_{0}.

If the elements of an sl_{2}-triple are regular, then their span is called a principal subalgebra.

== See also ==
- Affine Weyl group
- Finite Coxeter group
- Hasse diagram
- Linear algebraic group
- Nilpotent orbit
- Root system
- Special linear Lie algebra
- Weyl group
