= Special linear Lie algebra =

Concept in mathematics

In mathematics, the special linear Lie algebra of order $n$ over a field $F$, denoted $\mathfrak{sl}_n F$ or $\mathfrak{sl}(n, F)$, is the Lie algebra of all the $n \times n$ matrices (with entries in $F$) with trace zero and with the Lie bracket $[X,Y] := XY-YX$ given by the commutator. This algebra is well studied and understood, and is often used as a model for the study of other Lie algebras. The Lie group that it generates is the special linear group.

== Applications ==
The Lie algebra $\mathfrak{sl}_2 \mathbb{C}$ is central to the study of special relativity, general relativity and supersymmetry: its fundamental representation is the so-called spinor representation, while its adjoint representation generates the Lorentz group SO(3,1) of special relativity.

The algebra $\mathfrak{sl}_2 \mathbb{R}$ plays an important role in the study of chaos and fractals, as it generates the Möbius group SL(2,R), which describes the automorphisms of the hyperbolic plane, the simplest Riemann surface of negative curvature; by contrast, SL(2,C) describes the automorphisms of the hyperbolic 3-dimensional ball.

== Representation theory ==
=== Representation theory of sl_{2}C ===
The Lie algebra $\mathfrak{sl}_2 \mathbb{C}$ is a three-dimensional complex Lie algebra. Its defining feature is that it contains a basis $e, h, f$ satisfying the commutation relations

$[e,f]=h$, $[h,f]=-2f$, and $[h,e]=2e$.

This is a Cartan-Weyl basis for $\mathfrak{sl}_2 \mathbb{C}$. It has an explicit realization in terms of 2-by-2 complex matrices with zero trace:

$$E = \begin{bmatrix}
0&1\\
0&0
\end{bmatrix}$$,
$$F = \begin{bmatrix}
0&0\\
1&0
\end{bmatrix}$$,
$$H = \begin{bmatrix}
1&0\\
0&-1
\end{bmatrix}$$.

This is the fundamental or defining representation for $\mathfrak{sl}_2 \mathbb{C}$.

The Lie algebra $\mathfrak{sl}_2 \mathbb{C}$ can be viewed as a subspace of its universal enveloping algebra $U = U(\mathfrak{sl}_2 \mathbb{C})$ and, in $U$, there are the following commutator relations shown by induction:

$$[h, f^k] = -2 k f^k, \, [h, e^k] = 2 k e^k$$,
$$[e, f^k] = -k(k - 1)f^{k-1} + k f^{k-1} h$$.

Note that, here, the powers $f^k$, etc. refer to powers as elements of the algebra U and not matrix powers. The first basic fact (that follows from the above commutator relations) is:

Lemma—Let $V$ be a representation of $\mathfrak{sl}_2 \mathbb{C}$ and $v$ a vector in it. Set $v_j = {1 \over j!} f^j \cdot v$ for each $j = 0, 1, \dots$. If $v$ is an eigenvector of the action of $h$; i.e., $h \cdot v = \lambda v$ for some complex number $\lambda$, then, for each $j = 0, 1, \dots$,

- $h \cdot v_j = (\lambda - 2j) v_j$.
- $e \cdot v_j = {1 \over j!} f^j \cdot e \cdot v + (\lambda - j + 1) v_{j-1}$.
- $f \cdot v_j = (j+1) v_{j+1}$.

From this lemma, one deduces the following fundamental result:

Theorem—Let $V$ be a representation of $\mathfrak{sl}_2 \mathbb{C}$ that may have infinite dimension and $v$ a vector in $V$ that is a $\mathfrak{b} = \mathbb{C} h + \mathbb{C} e$-weight vector ($\mathfrak{b}$ is a Borel subalgebra). Then

- Those $v_j$'s that are nonzero are linearly independent.
- If some $v_j$ is zero, then the $h$-eigenvalue of v is a nonnegative integer $N \ge 0$ such that $v_0, v_1, \dots, v_N$ are nonzero and $v_{N+1} = v_{N+2} = \cdots = 0$. Moreover, the subspace spanned by the $v_j$'s is an irreducible $\mathfrak{sl}_2 \mathbb{C}$-subrepresentation of $V$.

The first statement is true since either $v_j$ is zero or has $h$-eigenvalue distinct from the eigenvalues of the others that are nonzero. Saying $v$ is a $\mathfrak{b}$-weight vector is equivalent to saying that it is simultaneously an eigenvector of $h$ and $e$; a short calculation then shows that, in that case, the $e$-eigenvalue of $v$ is zero: $e \cdot v = 0$. Thus, for some integer $N \ge 0$, $v_N \ne 0, v_{N+1} = v_{N+2} = \cdots = 0$ and in particular, by the early lemma,

$$0 = e \cdot v_{N+1} = (\lambda - (N+1) + 1) v_N,$$

which implies that $\lambda = N$. It remains to show $W = \operatorname{span} \{v_j \mid j \ge 0\}$ is irreducible. If $0 \ne W' \subset W$ is a subrepresentation, then it admits an eigenvector, which must have eigenvalue of the form $N - 2j$; thus is proportional to $v_j$. By the preceding lemma, we have $v = v_0$ is in $W$ and thus $W' = W$. $\square$

As a corollary, one deduces:

- If $V$ has finite dimension and is irreducible, then $h$-eigenvalue of v is a nonnegative integer $N$ and $V$ has a basis $v, f v, f^2 v, \cdots, f^N v$.
- Conversely, if the $h$-eigenvalue of $v$ is a nonnegative integer and $V$ is irreducible, then $V$ has a basis $v, f v, f^2 v, \cdots, f^N v$; in particular has finite dimension.

The beautiful special case of $\mathfrak{sl}_2$ shows a general way to find irreducible representations of Lie algebras. Namely, we divide the algebra to three subalgebras "h" (the Cartan subalgebra), "e", and "f", which behave approximately like their namesakes in $\mathfrak{sl}_2$. Namely, in an irreducible representation, we have a "highest" eigenvector of "h", on which "e" acts by zero. The basis of the irreducible representation is generated by the action of "f" on the highest eigenvectors of "h". See the theorem of the highest weight.

=== Representation theory of sl_{n}C ===
When $\mathfrak g = \mathfrak{sl}_n \mathbb C = \operatorname{\mathfrak{sl}}V$ for a complex vector space $V$ of dimension $n$, each finite-dimensional irreducible representation of $\mathfrak g$ can be found as a subrepresentation of a tensor power of $V$.

The Lie algebra can be explicitly realized as a matrix Lie algebra of traceless $n\times n$ matrices. This is the fundamental representation for $\mathfrak{sl}_n \mathbb{C}$.

Set $M_{i,j}$ to be the matrix with one in the $i,j$ entry and zeroes everywhere else. Then

$$H_i := M_{i,i} - M_{i+1,i+1},\text{ with } 1 \leq i \leq n-1$$
$$M_{i,j},\text{ with } i \neq j$$

Form a basis for $\mathfrak{sl}_n \mathbb{C}$. This is technically an abuse of notation, and these are really the image of the basis of $\mathfrak{sl}_n \mathbb{C}$ in the fundamental representation.

Furthermore, this is in fact a Cartan–Weyl basis, with the $H_i$ spanning the Cartan subalgebra. Introducing notation $E_{i,j} = M_{i,j}$ if $j > i$, and $F_{i,j} = M_{i,j}^T = M_{j,i}$, also if $j > i$, the $E_{i,j}$ are positive roots and $F_{i,j}$ are corresponding negative roots.

A basis of simple roots is given by $E_{i,i+1}$ for $1 \leq i \leq n-1$.

== See also ==
- Affine Weyl group
- Finite Coxeter group
- Hasse diagram
- Linear algebraic group
- Nilpotent orbit
- Root system
- sl2-triple
- Weyl group
