= 0Q =

0Q (zero Q) or 0-Q may refer to:

- 0Q, or 0 quarterback rating; see List of NFL quarterbacks who have posted a passer rating of zero
- 0Q, or Zero Q, dynamic pressure where air density becomes zero; see Max Q
- Q\{0} a group of rational numbers without zero; see Glossary of group theory

== See also ==
- Q0 (disambiguation)
