= Conjugacy-closed subgroup =

In mathematics, in the field of group theory, a subgroup of a group is said to be conjugacy-closed if any two elements of the subgroup that are conjugate in the group are also conjugate in the subgroup.

An alternative characterization of conjugacy-closed normal subgroups is that all class automorphisms of the whole group restrict to class automorphisms of the subgroup.

The following facts are true regarding conjugacy-closed subgroups:

- Every central factor (a subgroup that may occur as a factor in some central product) is a conjugacy-closed subgroup.
- Every conjugacy-closed normal subgroup is a transitively normal subgroup.
- The property of being conjugacy-closed is transitive, that is, every conjugacy-closed subgroup of a conjugacy-closed subgroup is conjugacy-closed.

The property of being conjugacy-closed is sometimes also termed as being conjugacy stable. It is a known result that for finite field extensions, the general linear group of the base field is a conjugacy-closed subgroup of the general linear group over the extension field. This result is typically referred to as a stability theorem.

A subgroup is said to be strongly conjugacy-closed if all intermediate subgroups are also conjugacy-closed.

== Examples and Non-Examples ==
=== Examples ===
1. Every subgroup of a commutative group is conjugacy closed.
