= Q0 =

Q0 may refer to:

- a graphics file format with extension .q0
- Q_{0}, a formulation of higher-order typed logic in mathematics
- a variable used in a digital counter

== See also ==
- 0Q (disambiguation)
