= Jacobson–Morozov theorem =

In mathematics, the Jacobson–Morozov theorem is the assertion that nilpotent elements in a semi-simple Lie algebra can be extended to sl_{2}-triples. The theorem is named after Jacobson 1951, Morozov 1942.

== Statement ==
The statement of Jacobson–Morozov relies on the following preliminary notions: an sl_{2}-triple in a semi-simple Lie algebra $\mathfrak g$ (throughout in this article, over a field of characteristic zero) is a homomorphism of Lie algebras $\mathfrak{sl}_2 \to \mathfrak g$. Equivalently, it is a triple $e, f, h$ of elements in $\mathfrak g$ satisfying the relations

$$[h,e] = 2e, \quad [h,f] = -2f, \quad [e,f] = h.$$

An element $x \in \mathfrak g$ is called nilpotent, if the endomorphism $[x, -] : \mathfrak g \to \mathfrak g$ (known as the adjoint representation) is a nilpotent endomorphism. It is an elementary fact that for any sl_{2}-triple $(e, f, h)$, e must be nilpotent. The Jacobson–Morozov theorem states that, conversely, any nilpotent non-zero element $e \in \mathfrak g$ can be extended to an sl_{2}-triple. For $\mathfrak g = \mathfrak{sl}_n$, the sl_{2}-triples obtained in this way are made explicit in Chriss & Ginzburg (1997, p. 184).

The theorem can also be stated for linear algebraic groups (again over a field k of characteristic zero): any morphism (of algebraic groups) from the additive group $G_a$ to a reductive group H factors through the embedding

$$G_a \to SL_2, x \mapsto \left ( \begin{array}{cc} 1 & x \\ 0 & 1 \end{array} \right ).$$

Furthermore, any two such factorizations

$$SL_2 \to H$$

are conjugate by a k-point of H.

== Generalization ==
A far-reaching generalization of the theorem as formulated above can be stated as follows: the inclusion of pro-reductive groups into all linear algebraic groups, where morphisms $G \to H$ in both categories are taken up to conjugation by elements in $H(k)$, admits a left adjoint, the so-called pro-reductive envelope. This left adjoint sends the additive group $G_a$ to $SL_2$ (which happens to be semi-simple, as opposed to pro-reductive), thereby recovering the above form of Jacobson–Morozov. This generalized Jacobson–Morozov theorem was proven by André & Kahn (2002, Theorem 19.3.1) by appealing to methods related to Tannakian categories and by O'Sullivan (2010) by more geometric methods.
