= Central subgroup =

In mathematics, in the field of group theory, a subgroup of a group is termed central if it lies inside the center of the group.

Given a group $G$, the center of $G$, denoted as $Z(G)$, is defined as the set of those elements of the group which commute with every element of the group. The center is a characteristic subgroup. A subgroup $H$ of $G$ is termed central if $H \leq Z(G)$.

Central subgroups have the following properties:

- They are abelian groups (because, in particular, all elements of the center must commute with each other).
- They are normal subgroups. They are central factors, and are hence transitively normal subgroups.
