= Nilpotent orbit =

In mathematics, nilpotent orbits are generalizations of nilpotent matrices that play an important role in representation theory of real and complex semisimple Lie groups and semisimple Lie algebras.

== Definition ==
An element X of a semisimple Lie algebra g is called nilpotent if its adjoint endomorphism

ad X: g → g, ad X(Y) = [X,Y]

is nilpotent, that is, (ad X)^{n} = 0 for large enough n. Equivalently, X is nilpotent if its characteristic polynomial p_{ad X}(t) is equal to t^{dim g}.

A semisimple Lie group or algebraic group G acts on its Lie algebra via the adjoint representation, and the property of being nilpotent is invariant under this action. A nilpotent orbit is an orbit of the adjoint action such that any (equivalently, all) of its elements is (are) nilpotent.

== Examples ==
Nilpotent $n\times n$ matrices with complex entries form the main motivating case for the general theory, corresponding to the complex general linear group. From the Jordan normal form of matrices we know that each nilpotent matrix is conjugate to a unique matrix with Jordan blocks of sizes $\lambda_1\geq \lambda_2\geq\ldots\geq\lambda_r,$ where $\lambda$ is a partition of n. Thus in the case n=2 there are two nilpotent orbits, the zero orbit consisting of the zero matrix and corresponding to the partition (1,1) and the principal orbit consisting of all non-zero matrices A with zero trace and determinant,

$$A=\begin{bmatrix}x & y\\ z & -x \end{bmatrix}, \quad (x,y,z)\ne (0,0,0)\quad{\;}$$
with $x^2+yz=0,$

corresponding to the partition (2). Geometrically, this orbit is a two-dimensional complex quadratic cone in four-dimensional vector space of $2\times 2$ matrices minus its apex.

The complex special linear group is a subgroup of the general linear group with the same nilpotent orbits. However, if we replace the complex special linear group with the real special linear group, new nilpotent orbits may arise. In particular, for n=2 there are now 3 nilpotent orbits: the zero orbit and two real half-cones (without the apex), corresponding to positive and negative values of $y-z$ in the parametrization above.

== Properties ==
- Nilpotent orbits can be characterized as those orbits of the adjoint action whose Zariski closure contains 0.
- Nilpotent orbits are finite in number.
- The Zariski closure of a nilpotent orbit is a union of nilpotent orbits.
- Jacobson–Morozov theorem: over a field of characteristic zero, any nilpotent element e can be included into an sl_{2}-triple {e,h,f} and all such triples are conjugate by Z_{G}(e), the centralizer of e in G. Together with the representation theory of sl_{2}, this allows one to label nilpotent orbits by finite combinatorial data, giving rise to the Dynkin–Kostant classification of nilpotent orbits.

== Poset structure ==
Nilpotent orbits form a partially ordered set: given two nilpotent orbits, O_{1} is less than or equal to O_{2} if O_{1} is contained in the Zariski closure of O_{2}. This poset has a unique minimal element, zero orbit, and unique maximal element, the regular nilpotent orbit, but in general, it is not a graded poset. If the ground field is algebraically closed then the zero orbit is covered by a unique orbit, called the minimal orbit, and the regular orbit covers a unique orbit, called the subregular orbit.

In the case of the special linear group SL_{n}, the nilpotent orbits are parametrized by the partitions of n. By a theorem of Gerstenhaber, the ordering of the orbits corresponds to the dominance order on the partitions of n. Moreover, if G is an isometry group of a bilinear form, i.e. an orthogonal or symplectic subgroup of SL_{n}, then its nilpotent orbits are parametrized by partitions of n satisfying a certain parity condition and the corresponding poset structure is induced by the dominance order on all partitions (this is a nontrivial theorem, due to Gerstenhaber and Hesselink).

== See also ==
- Adjoint representation
