= Group analysis of differential equations =

Group analysis of differential equations is a branch of mathematics that studies the symmetry properties of differential equations with respect to various transformations of independent and dependent variables. It includes methods and applied aspects of differential geometry, Lie groups and algebras theory, calculus of variations and is, in turn, a powerful research tool in theories of ODEs, PDEs, mathematical and theoretical physics.
