= Maximal torus =

Maximal compact connected Abelian Lie subgroup

In the mathematical theory of compact Lie groups a special role is played by torus subgroups, in particular by the maximal torus subgroups.

A torus in a compact Lie group G is a compact, connected, abelian Lie subgroup of G (and therefore isomorphic to the standard torus T^{n}). A maximal torus is one which is maximal among such subgroups. That is, T is a maximal torus if for any torus T′ containing T we have T = T′. Every torus is contained in a maximal torus simply by dimensional considerations. A noncompact Lie group need not have any nontrivial tori (e.g. R^{n}).

The dimension of a maximal torus in G is called the rank of G. The rank is well-defined since all maximal tori turn out to be conjugate. For semisimple groups the rank is equal to the number of nodes in the associated Dynkin diagram.

== Examples ==
The unitary group U(n) has as a maximal torus the subgroup of all diagonal matrices. That is,

$$T = \left\{\operatorname{diag}\left(e^{i\theta_1},e^{i\theta_2},\dots,e^{i\theta_n}\right) : \forall j, \theta_j \in \mathbb{R}\right\}.$$

T is clearly isomorphic to the product of n circles, so the unitary group U(n) has rank n. A maximal torus in the special unitary group SU(n) ⊂ U(n) is just the intersection of T and SU(n) which is a torus of dimension n − 1.

A maximal torus in the special orthogonal group SO(2n) is given by the set of all simultaneous rotations in any fixed choice of n pairwise orthogonal planes (i.e., two dimensional vector spaces). Concretely, one maximal torus consists of all block-diagonal matrices with $2\times 2$ diagonal blocks, where each diagonal block is a rotation matrix. This is also a maximal torus in the group SO(2n+1) where the action fixes the remaining direction. Thus both SO(2n) and SO(2n+1) have rank n. For example, in the rotation group SO(3) the maximal tori are given by rotations about a fixed axis.

The symplectic group Sp(n) has rank n. A maximal torus is given by the set of all diagonal matrices whose entries all lie in a fixed complex subalgebra of H.

== Properties ==
Let G be a compact, connected Lie group and let $\mathfrak g$ be the Lie algebra of G. The first main result is the torus theorem, which may be formulated as follows:

Torus theorem: If T is one fixed maximal torus in G, then every element of G is conjugate to an element of T.

This theorem has the following consequences:

- All maximal tori in G are conjugate.
- All maximal tori have the same dimension, known as the rank of G.
- A maximal torus in G is a maximal abelian subgroup, but the converse need not hold.
- The maximal tori in G are exactly the Lie subgroups corresponding to the maximal abelian subalgebras of $\mathfrak g$ (cf. Cartan subalgebra)
- Every element of G lies in some maximal torus; thus, the exponential map for G is surjective.
- If G has dimension n and rank r then n − r is even.

== Root system ==
If T is a maximal torus in a compact Lie group G, one can define a root system as follows. The roots are the weights for the adjoint action of T on the complexified Lie algebra of G. To be more explicit, let $\mathfrak t$ denote the Lie algebra of T, let $\mathfrak g$ denote the Lie algebra of $G$, and let $\mathfrak g_{\mathbb C}:=\mathfrak g\oplus i\mathfrak g$ denote the complexification of $\mathfrak g$. Then we say that an element $\alpha\in\mathfrak t$ is a root for G relative to T if $\alpha\neq 0$ and there exists a nonzero $X\in\mathfrak g_{\mathbb C}$ such that

$$\mathrm{Ad}_{e^H}(X)=e^{i\langle\alpha,H\rangle}X$$

for all $H\in\mathfrak t$. Here $\langle\cdot,\cdot\rangle$ is a fixed inner product on $\mathfrak g$ that is invariant under the adjoint action of connected compact Lie groups.

The root system, as a subset of the Lie algebra $\mathfrak t$ of T, has all the usual properties of a root system, except that the roots may not span $\mathfrak t$. The root system is a key tool in understanding the classification and representation theory of G.

== Weyl group ==
Given a torus T (not necessarily maximal), the Weyl group of G with respect to T can be defined as the normalizer of T modulo the centralizer of T. That is,

$$W(T,G) := N_G(T)/C_G(T).$$

Fix a maximal torus $T = T_0$ in G; then the corresponding Weyl group is called the Weyl group of G (it depends up to isomorphism on the choice of T).

The first two major results about the Weyl group are as follows.

- The centralizer of T in G is equal to T, so the Weyl group is equal to N(T)/T.
- The Weyl group is generated by reflections about the roots of the associated Lie algebra. Thus, the Weyl group of T is isomorphic to the Weyl group of the root system of the Lie algebra of G.

We now list some consequences of these main results.

- Two elements in T are conjugate if and only if they are conjugate by an element of W. That is, each conjugacy class of G intersects T in exactly one Weyl orbit. In fact, the space of conjugacy classes in G is homeomorphic to the orbit space T/W.
- The Weyl group acts by (outer) automorphisms on T (and its Lie algebra).
- The identity component of the normalizer of T is also equal to T. The Weyl group is therefore equal to the component group of N(T).
- The Weyl group is finite.

The representation theory of G is essentially determined by T and W.

As an example, consider the case $G=SU(n)$ with $T$ being the diagonal subgroup of $G$. Then $x\in G$ belongs to $N(T)$ if and only if $x$ maps each standard basis element $e_i$ to a multiple of some other standard basis element $e_j$, that is, if and only if $x$ permutes the standard basis elements, up to multiplication by some constants. The Weyl group in this case is then the permutation group on $n$ elements.

== Weyl integral formula ==
Suppose f is a continuous function on G. Then the integral over G of f with respect to the normalized Haar measure dg may be computed as follows:

$$\displaystyle{\int_G f(g)\, dg = |W|^{-1} \int_T |\Delta(t)|^2\int_{G/T}f\left(yty^{-1}\right)\,d[y]\, dt,}$$

where $d[y]$ is the normalized volume measure on the quotient manifold $G/T$ and $dt$ is the normalized Haar measure on T. Here Δ is given by the Weyl denominator formula and $|W|$ is the order of the Weyl group. An important special case of this result occurs when f is a class function, that is, a function invariant under conjugation. In that case, we have

$$\displaystyle{\int_G f(g)\, dg = |W|^{-1} \int_T f(t) |\Delta(t)|^2\, dt.}$$

Consider as an example the case $G=SU(2)$, with $T$ being the diagonal subgroup. Then the Weyl integral formula for class functions takes the following explicit form:

$$\displaystyle{\int_{SU(2)} f(g)\, dg = \frac{1}{2} \int_0^{2\pi} f\left(\mathrm{diag}\left(e^{i\theta}, e^{-i\theta}\right)\right)\, 4\,\mathrm{sin}^2(\theta)  \, \frac{d\theta}{2\pi}.}$$

Here $|W|=2$, the normalized Haar measure on $T$ is $\frac{d\theta}{2\pi}$, and $\mathrm{diag}\left(e^{i\theta}, e^{-i\theta}\right)$ denotes the diagonal matrix with diagonal entries $e^{i\theta}$ and $e^{-i\theta}$.

== See also ==
- Algebraic torus
- Compact group
- Cartan subgroup
- Cartan subalgebra
- Toral Lie algebra
- Bruhat decomposition
- Weyl character formula
- Representation theory of a connected compact Lie group
