= FC-group =

Group in group theory mathematics

In mathematics, in the field of group theory, an FC-group is a group in which every conjugacy class of elements has finite cardinality.

The following are some facts about FC-groups:

- Every finite group is an FC-group.
- Every abelian group is an FC-group.
- The following property is stronger than the property of being FC: every subgroup has finite index in its normal closure.
