= Nilpotent cone =

In mathematics, the nilpotent cone $\mathcal{N}$ of a finite-dimensional semisimple Lie algebra $\mathfrak{g}$ is the set of elements that act nilpotently in all representations of $\mathfrak{g}.$ In other words,

$$\mathcal{N}=\{ a\in \mathfrak{g}: \rho(a) \mbox{ is nilpotent for all representations } \rho:\mathfrak{g}\to \operatorname{End}(V)\}.$$

The nilpotent cone is an irreducible subvariety of $\mathfrak{g}$ (considered as a vector space).

== Example ==
The nilpotent cone of $\operatorname{sl}_2$, the Lie algebra of 2×2 matrices with vanishing trace, is the variety of all 2×2 traceless matrices with rank less than or equal to $1.$
