= Regular element of a Lie algebra =

In mathematics, a regular element of a Lie algebra or Lie group is an element whose centralizer has dimension as small as possible. For example, in a complex semisimple Lie algebra, an element $X \in \mathfrak{g}$ is regular if its centralizer in $\mathfrak{g}$ has dimension equal to the rank of $\mathfrak{g}$, which in turn equals the dimension of some Cartan subalgebra $\mathfrak{h}$ (note that in earlier papers, an element of a complex semisimple Lie algebra was termed regular if it is semisimple and the kernel of its adjoint representation is a Cartan subalgebra). An element $g \in G$ a Lie group is regular if its centralizer has dimension equal to the rank of $G$.

== Basic case ==
In the specific case of $\mathfrak{gl}_n(\mathbb{k})$, the Lie algebra of $n \times n$ matrices over an algebraically closed field $\mathbb{k}$ (such as the complex numbers), a regular element $M$ is an element whose Jordan normal form contains a single Jordan block for each eigenvalue (in other words, the geometric multiplicity of each eigenvalue is 1). The centralizer of a regular element is the set of polynomials of degree less than $n$ evaluated at the matrix $M$, and therefore the centralizer has dimension $n$ (which equals the rank of $\mathfrak{gl}_n$, but is not necessarily an algebraic torus).

If the matrix $M$ is diagonalisable, then it is regular if and only if there are $n$ different eigenvalues. To see this, notice that $M$ will commute with any matrix $P$ that stabilises each of its eigenspaces. If there are $n$ different eigenvalues, then this happens only if $P$ is diagonalisable on the same basis as $M$; in fact $P$ is a linear combination of the first $n$ powers of $M$, and the centralizer is an algebraic torus of complex dimension $n$ (real dimension $2n$); since this is the smallest possible dimension of a centralizer, the matrix $M$ is regular. However if there are equal eigenvalues, then the centralizer is the product of the general linear groups of the eigenspaces of $M$, and has strictly larger dimension, so that $M$ is not regular.

For a connected compact Lie group $G$, the regular elements form an open dense subset, made up of $G$-conjugacy classes of the elements in a maximal torus $T$ which are regular in $G$. The regular elements of $T$ are themselves explicitly given as the complement of a set in $T$, a set of codimension-one subtori corresponding to the root system of $G$. Similarly, in the Lie algebra $\mathfrak{g}$ of $G$, the regular elements form an open dense subset which can be described explicitly as adjoint $G$-orbits of regular elements of the Lie algebra of $T$, the elements outside the hyperplanes corresponding to the root system.

== Definition ==
Let $\mathfrak{g}$ be a finite-dimensional Lie algebra over an infinite field. For each $x \in \mathfrak{g}$, let

$$p_x(t) = \det(t - \operatorname{ad}(x)) = \sum_{i=0}^{\dim \mathfrak{g}} a_i(x) t^i$$

be the characteristic polynomial of the adjoint endomorphism $\operatorname{ad}(x) : y \mapsto [x, y]$ of $\mathfrak g$. Then, by definition, the rank of $\mathfrak{g}$ is the least integer $r$ such that $a_r(x) \ne 0$ for some $x \in \mathfrak g$ and is denoted by $\operatorname{rk}(\mathfrak{g})$. For example, since $a_{\dim \mathfrak g}(x) = 1$ for every x, $\mathfrak g$ is nilpotent (i.e., each $\operatorname{ad}(x)$ is nilpotent by Engel's theorem) if and only if $\operatorname{rk}(\mathfrak{g}) = \dim \mathfrak g$. Over an algebraically closed field of characteristic zero, if $\mathfrak h$ is a Cartan subalgebra of $\mathfrak g$ then $\operatorname{rk}(\mathfrak{g}) = \dim \mathfrak h$; see the section below.

Let $\mathfrak{g}_{\text{reg}} = \{ x \in \mathfrak{g} | a_{\operatorname{rk}(\mathfrak{g})} (x) \ne 0 \}$. By definition, a regular element of $\mathfrak{g}$ is an element of the set $\mathfrak{g}_{\text{reg}}$. Since $a_{\operatorname{rk}(\mathfrak{g})}$ is a polynomial function on $\mathfrak{g}$, with respect to the Zariski topology, the set $\mathfrak{g}_{\text{reg}}$ is an open subset of $\mathfrak{g}$.

Over $\mathbb{C}$, $\mathfrak{g}_{\text{reg}}$ is a connected set (with respect to the usual topology), but over $\mathbb{R}$, it is only a finite union of connected open sets.

== A Cartan subalgebra and a regular element ==
Over an infinite field, a regular element can be used to construct a Cartan subalgebra, a self-normalizing nilpotent subalgebra. Over a field of characteristic zero, this approach constructs all the Cartan subalgebras.

Given an element $x \in \mathfrak{g}$, let

$$\mathfrak{g}^0(x) = \sum_{n \ge 0} \ker(\operatorname{ad}(x)^n : \mathfrak{g} \to \mathfrak{g})$$

be the generalized eigenspace of $\operatorname{ad}(x)$ for eigenvalue zero. It is a subalgebra of $\mathfrak g$. Note that $\dim \mathfrak{g}^0(x)$ is the same as the (algebraic) multiplicity of zero as an eigenvalue of $\operatorname{ad}(x)$; i.e., the least integer m such that $a_m(x) \ne 0$ in the notation in § Definition. Thus, $\operatorname{rk}(\mathfrak g) \le \dim \mathfrak{g}^0(x)$ and the equality holds if and only if $x$ is a regular element.

The statement is then that if $x$ is a regular element, then $\mathfrak{g}^0(x)$ is a Cartan subalgebra. Thus, $\operatorname{rk}(\mathfrak g)$ is the dimension of at least some Cartan subalgebra; in fact, $\operatorname{rk}(\mathfrak g)$ is the minimum dimension of a Cartan subalgebra. More strongly, over a field of characteristic zero (e.g., $\mathbb{R}$ or $\mathbb{C}$),

- every Cartan subalgebra of $\mathfrak{g}$ has the same dimension; thus, $\operatorname{rk}(\mathfrak g)$ is the dimension of an arbitrary Cartan subalgebra,
- an element x of $\mathfrak g$ is regular if and only if $\mathfrak{g}^0(x)$ is a Cartan subalgebra, and
- every Cartan subalgebra is of the form $\mathfrak{g}^0(x)$ for some regular element $x \in \mathfrak g$.

== A regular element in a Cartan subalgebra of a complex semisimple Lie algebra ==
For a Cartan subalgebra $\mathfrak h$ of a complex semisimple Lie algebra $\mathfrak g$ with the root system $\Phi$, an element of $\mathfrak h$ is regular if and only if it is not in the union of hyperplanes $\bigcup_{\alpha \in \Phi} \{ h \in \mathfrak{h} \mid \alpha(h) = 0 \}$. This is because: for $r = \dim \mathfrak h$,

- For each $h \in \mathfrak{h}$, the characteristic polynomial of $\operatorname{ad}(h)$ is $t^r \left(t^{\dim \mathfrak g - r} - \sum_{\alpha \in \Phi} \alpha(h) t^{\dim \mathfrak g - r - 1} + \cdots \pm \prod_{\alpha \in \Phi} \alpha(h)\right)$.

This characterization is sometimes taken as the definition of a regular element (especially when only regular elements in Cartan subalgebras are of interest).
