= Toral subalgebra =

Lie algebra all of which elements are semisimple

In mathematics, a toral subalgebra is a Lie subalgebra of a general linear Lie algebra all of whose elements are semisimple (or diagonalizable over an algebraically closed field). Over an algebraically closed field, every toral Lie algebra is abelian; thus, its elements are simultaneously diagonalizable.

== In semisimple and reductive Lie algebras ==
A subalgebra $\mathfrak h$ of a semisimple Lie algebra $\mathfrak g$ is called toral if the adjoint representation of $\mathfrak h$ on $\mathfrak g$, $\operatorname{ad}(\mathfrak h) \subset \mathfrak{gl}(\mathfrak g)$ is a toral subalgebra. A maximal toral Lie subalgebra of a finite-dimensional semisimple Lie algebra, or more generally of a finite-dimensional reductive Lie algebra, over an algebraically closed field of characteristic 0 is a Cartan subalgebra and vice versa. In particular, a maximal toral Lie subalgebra in this setting is self-normalizing, coincides with its centralizer, and the Killing form of $\mathfrak g$ restricted to $\mathfrak h$ is nondegenerate.

For more general Lie algebras, a Cartan subalgebra may differ from a maximal toral subalgebra.

In a finite-dimensional semisimple Lie algebra $\mathfrak g$ over an algebraically closed field of a characteristic zero, a toral subalgebra exists. In fact, if $\mathfrak g$ has only nilpotent elements, then it is nilpotent (Engel's theorem), but then its Killing form is identically zero, contradicting semisimplicity. Hence, $\mathfrak g$ must have a nonzero semisimple element, say x; the linear span of x is then a toral subalgebra.

== See also ==
- Maximal torus, in the theory of Lie groups
