= Transitively normal subgroup =

Property of a subgroup in mathematics

In mathematics, in the field of group theory, a subgroup of a group is said to be transitively normal in the group if every normal subgroup of the subgroup is also normal in the whole group. In symbols, $H$ is a transitively normal subgroup of $G$ if for every $K$ normal in $H$, we have that $K$ is normal in $G$.

An alternate way to characterize these subgroups is: every normal subgroup preserving automorphism of the whole group must restrict to a normal subgroup preserving automorphism of the subgroup.

Here are some facts about transitively normal subgroups:

- Every normal subgroup of a transitively normal subgroup is normal.
- Every direct factor, or more generally, every central factor is transitively normal. Thus, every central subgroup is transitively normal.
- A transitively normal subgroup of a transitively normal subgroup is transitively normal.
- A transitively normal subgroup is normal.

== See also ==
- Normal subgroup
