= Conjugacy class =

In group theory, equivalence class under the relation of conjugation

Two Cayley graphs of dihedral groups with conjugacy classes distinguished by color.

In mathematics, especially group theory, two elements $a$ and $b$ of a group are conjugate if there is an element $g$ in the group such that $b = gag^{-1}.$ This is an equivalence relation whose equivalence classes are called conjugacy classes. In other words, each conjugacy class is closed under the maps $a\mapsto gag^{-1},$ with $g$ an element of the group.

Members of the same conjugacy class cannot be distinguished by using only the group structure, and therefore share many properties. The study of conjugacy classes of non-abelian groups is fundamental for the study of their structure. For an abelian group, each conjugacy class is a set containing one element (singleton set).

Functions that are constant for members of the same conjugacy class are called class functions.

The notion of a conjugate may be extended from elements to subsets: subsets $S$ and $T$ of $G$ are conjugate if there is an element $g\in G$ such that $T = gSg^{-1},$ where $gSg^{-1} = \left\{gsg^{-1} : s\in S\right\}.$ The conjugacy class of $S$ is the set of all subsets of $G$ conjugate to $S.$ A normal subgroup is defined by the property that its conjugacy class contains a single member, namely itself. Normal subgroups play a key role in the study of quotient groups and group homomorphisms.

== Motivation ==
The concept of conjugation may come from trying to formalize the idea that two group elements are considered the "same" after a relabeling of elements.

For example, consider the symmetric group $S_5$ of order $5!$, and elements $\sigma$ and $\pi\sigma\pi^{-1}$ that are conjugate. An element $\pi\sigma\pi^{-1}$ can be viewed as simply "renaming" the elements $1,2,3,4,5$ to $\pi(1),\pi(2),\pi(3),\pi(4),\pi(5)$ then applying the permutation $\sigma$ on this new labeling.

$$\text{If }\sigma = \begin{matrix}1 \mapsto 3\\2 \mapsto 1\\3\mapsto 5\\4 \mapsto 2\\5 \mapsto 4\end{matrix}\quad\text{ then } \pi\sigma\pi^{-1} = \begin{matrix}\pi(1) \mapsto \pi(3)\\\pi(2) \mapsto \pi(1)\\\pi(3)\mapsto \pi(5)\\\pi(4) \mapsto \pi(2)\\\pi(5) \mapsto \pi(4)\end{matrix}$$

The conjugacy action by $\pi$ does not change the underlying structure of $\sigma$. In a way, permutations $\sigma$ and $\pi\sigma\pi^{-1}$ have the same "shape". This includes their order, parity, degree, cycle type, etc.

In general, a map $a\mapsto gag^{-1},$ where $g$ is a fixed element of a group $G$ is an automorphism of $G$, that is, a map from $G$ to itself that preserves the group structure. Such an automorphism is called an inner automorphism.

Another way to illustrate the conjugacy action is by considering the general linear group $\operatorname{GL}(n)$ of invertible matrices. Two matrices $A$ and $B$ conjugate if there exists a matrix $P$ such that $B=PAP^{-1}$, which is the same condition as matrix similarity. The two matrices are conjugates if they are the "same" under two possibly different bases, with $P$ being the change-of-basis matrix.

In the study of three-dimensional rotations, vectors may be represented by $2\times2$ complex matrices. Rotation of a vector is then realized as conjugation by another $2\times2$ complex matrix whose elements are the Cayley–Klein parameters, an operation that can also be expressed in terms of unit quaternions.

Conjugate subgroups come up in some important theorems of group theory. An example is one of the Sylow theorems, which states that, for a fixed prime $p$, all Sylow $p$-subgroups of a finite group $G$ are conjugates of each other.

== Definition ==
Let $G$ be a group. Two elements $a, b \in G$ are conjugate if there exists an element $g \in G$ such that $gag^{-1} = b,$ in which case $b$ is called a conjugate of $a$ and $a$ is called a conjugate of $b.$

In the case of the general linear group $\operatorname{GL}(n)$ of invertible matrices, the conjugacy relation is called matrix similarity.

It can be easily shown that conjugacy is an equivalence relation and therefore partitions $G$ into equivalence classes. (This means that every element of the group belongs to precisely one conjugacy class, and the classes $\operatorname{Cl}(a)$ and $\operatorname{Cl}(b)$ are equal if and only if $a$ and $b$ are conjugate, and disjoint otherwise.) The equivalence class that contains the element $a \in G$ is
$$\operatorname{Cl}(a) = \left\{ gag^{-1} : g \in G \right\}$$
and is called the conjugacy class of $a.$ The class number of $G$ is the number of distinct (nonequivalent) conjugacy classes.

Conjugacy classes may be referred to by describing them, or more briefly by abbreviations such as "6A", meaning "a certain conjugacy class with elements of order 6", and "6B" would be a different conjugacy class with elements of order 6; the conjugacy class 1A is the conjugacy class of the identity which has order 1. In some cases, conjugacy classes can be described in a uniform way; for example, in the symmetric group they can be described by cycle type.

== Properties ==
The identity element is always the only element in its class, that is $\operatorname{Cl}(e) = \{ e \}.$ More generally, an element $a\in G$ lies in the center $\operatorname{Z}(G)$ of $G$ if and only if its conjugacy class has only one element, $a$ itself. This follows because if $a\in\operatorname{Z}(G)$ then $gag^{-1} = a$ for all $g \in G.$ Hence if $G$ is abelian, $\operatorname{Cl}(a) = \{ a \}$ for all $a \in G$ (and the converse is also true: if all conjugacy classes are singletons then $G$ is abelian).

If two elements $a, b \in G$ belong to the same conjugacy class (that is, if they are conjugate), then they have the same order. More generally, every statement about $a$ can be translated into a statement about $b = gag^{-1},$ because the map $\varphi(x) = gxg^{-1},$ as noted previously, is an automorphism of $G$.

As an example, if $a$ and $b$ are conjugate, then so are their powers $a^k$ and $b^k.$ (Proof: if $a = gbg^{-1}$ then $a^k = \left(gbg^{-1}\right)\left(gbg^{-1}\right) \cdots \left(gbg^{-1}\right) = gb^kg^{-1}.$) Thus taking the kth power gives a map on conjugacy classes, and one may consider which conjugacy classes are in its preimage. For example, in the symmetric group, the square of an element of type (3)(2) (a 3-cycle and a 2-cycle) is an element of type (3), therefore one of the power-up classes of (3) is the class (3)(2) (where $a$ is a power-up class of $a^k$).

An inner automorphism on $G$ given by $a\mapsto gag^{-1}$ is the identity automorphism if and only if $g\in\operatorname{Z}(G)$. This implies that the quotient group $G/\operatorname{Z}(G)$ is isomorphic to the group of inner automorphisms of $G.$

== Examples ==
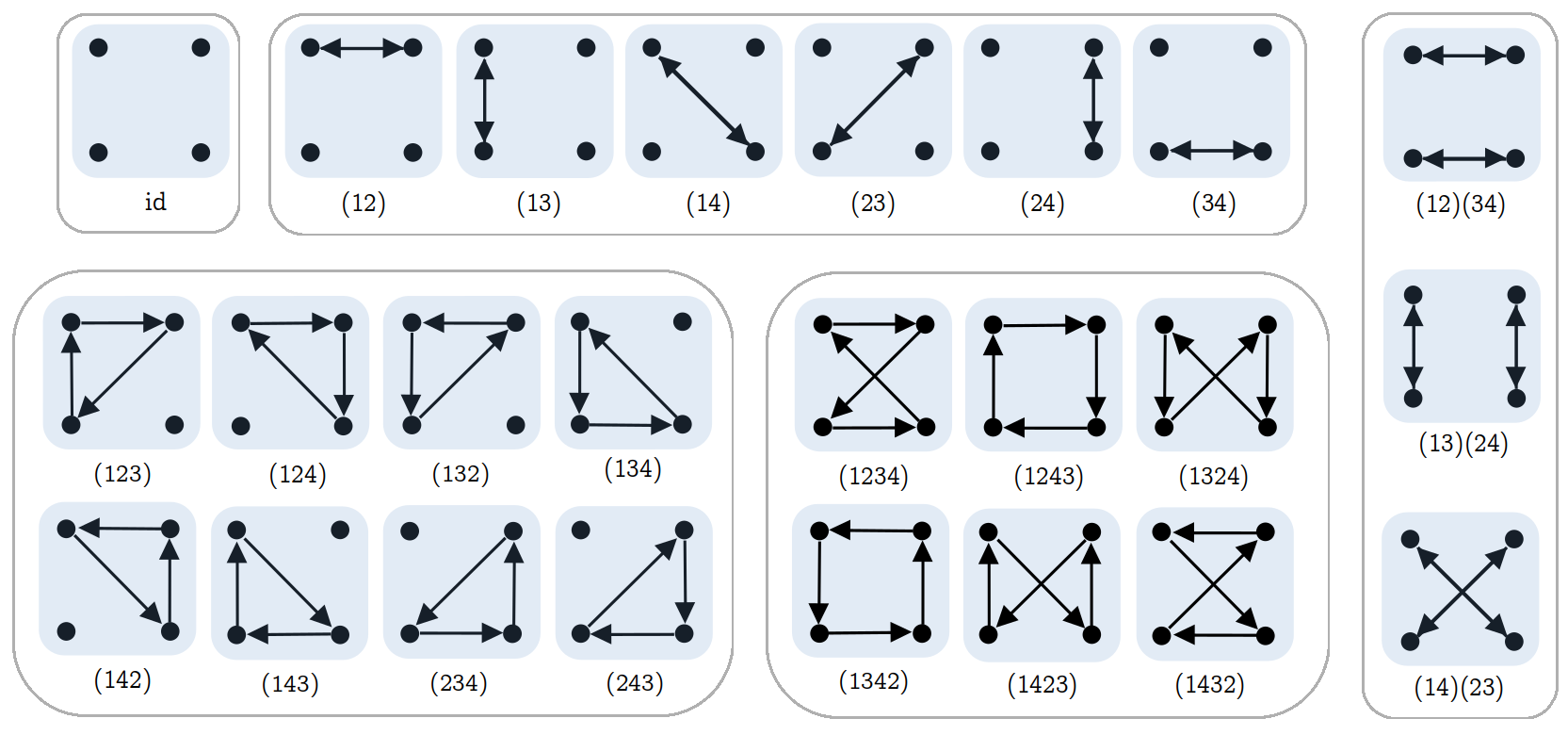
All 4! = 24 possible permutations from $S_4$, partitioned into conjugacy classes. Two elements belong in the same class iff they have the same cycle type.

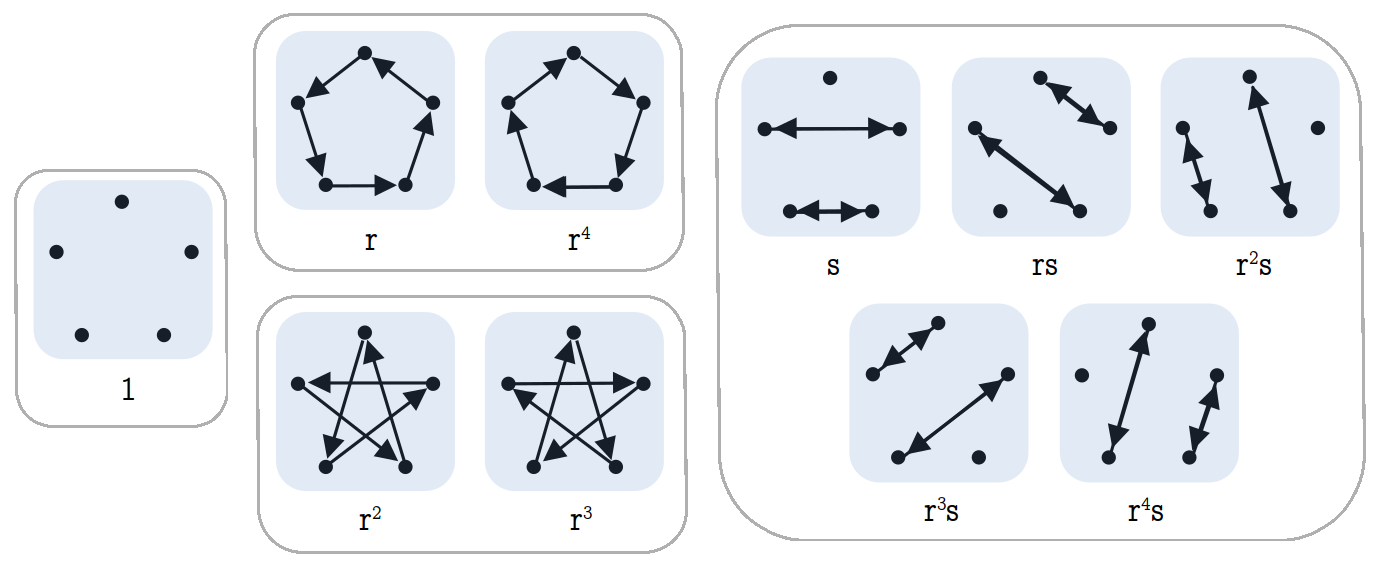
All 10 possible permutations from $D_5$, partitioned into conjugacy classes.

The symmetric group $S_3,$ consisting of the 6 permutations of three elements, has three conjugacy classes:

1. No change: $(abc \to abc)$
2. Transposing two: $(abc \to acb, abc \to bac, abc \to cba)$
3. A cyclic permutation of all three: $(abc \to bca, abc \to cab)$

These three classes also correspond to the classification of the isometries of an equilateral triangle.

For example, in the third class above (corresponding to rotations of the equilateral triangle by 120 and 240 degrees, respectively), a possible choice for g would be the transposition $abc \to acb$ from the second class (corresponding to the flipping of the triangle around its axis going through a, which is its own inverse): flipping a triangle vertically, then rotating it by 120 degrees, then flipping it again ($abc \to acb \to bac \to bca$) is equivalent to rotating the unflipped triangle by 270 degrees ($abc \to bca$).

The symmetric group $S_4,$ consisting of the 24 permutations of four elements, has five conjugacy classes, listed with their members using cycle notation:

1. No change: $\{(1)\}$
2. Interchanging two: $\{(12), (13), (14), (23), (24), (34)\}$
3. A cyclic permutation of three: $\{(123), (124), (132), (134), (142), (143), (234), (243)\}$
4. A cyclic permutation of all four: $\{(1234), (1243), (1324), (1342), (1423), (1432)\}$
5. Interchanging two, and also the other two: $\{(12)(34), (13)(24), (14)(23)\}$

In general, the number of conjugacy classes in the symmetric group $S_n$ is equal to the number of integer partitions of $n.$ This is because each conjugacy class corresponds to exactly one partition of $\{ 1, 2, \ldots, n \}$ into cycles, up to permutation of the elements of $\{ 1, 2, \ldots, n \}.$ The size of $\operatorname{Cl}(\sigma),$ for $\sigma\in S_m,$ can be computed from the cycle lengths. Let $m_1, m_2, \ldots, m_s$ be the distinct integers which appear as lengths of cycles in the cycle type of $\sigma$ (including 1-cycles) and let $k_i$ be the number of cycles of length $m_i$ for each $i = 1, 2, \ldots, s$ (so that $\sum_{i=1}^s k_i m_i = n$). Then the number of elements in $\operatorname{Cl}(\sigma)$ is
$$\frac{n!}{\left(k_1!\,m_1^{k_1}\right) \left(k_2!\,m_2^{k_2}\right) \cdots \left(k_s!\,m_s^{k_s}\right)}.$$

The dihedral group $D_5$ consisting of symmetries of a pentagon, has four conjugacy classes:

1. The identity element: $\{1\}$
2. Two conjugacy classes of size 2: $\{r,r^4\},\{r^2,r^3\}$
3. All the reflections: $\{s,rs,r^2s,r^3s,r^4s\}$

== Conjugation as a group action, centralizers, and the class equation ==
For any two elements $g, x \in G,$ let
$$g \cdot x := gxg^{-1}.$$
This defines a group action of $G$ on $G.$ The orbits of this action are the conjugacy classes. Let $\operatorname{C}_G(a)$ denote the centralizer of $a \in G,$ i.e., the subgroup consisting of all elements $b\in G$ such that $ba = ab.$ Then the stabilizer of a given element $x\in G$ is $\operatorname{C}_G(x).$ Moreover, the set of elements fixed by $g\in G$ under conjugation is $\operatorname{C}_G(g).$

=== Conjugacy class equation ===
For any element $a$ of a group $G,$ the elements of the conjugacy class of $a$ are in one-to-one correspondence with cosets of the centralizer $\operatorname{C}_G(a).$ This can be seen by observing that any two elements $b$ and $c$ belong to the same coset of $\operatorname{C}_G(a),$ meaning $b = cz$ for some $z\in\operatorname{C}_G(a),$ if and only if they give rise to the same element when conjugating $a$:
$$bab^{-1} = cac^{-1} \Longleftrightarrow \left(c^{-1}b\right)a = a\left(c^{-1}b\right) \Longleftrightarrow z = c^{-1}b \in \operatorname{C}_G(a).$$
This is a special case of the orbit-stabilizer theorem, keeping in mind that conjugacy classes are orbits and centralizers are stabilizers under the action of the group on itself through conjugation.

Thus if $G$ is a finite group, the number of elements in the conjugacy class of $a$ is the index $\left[ G : \operatorname{C}_G(a)\right]$ of the centralizer $\operatorname{C}_G(a)$ in $G$; hence the size of each conjugacy class divides the order of the group.

Furthermore, if we choose a single representative element $x_i$ from every conjugacy class, we infer from the disjointness of the conjugacy classes that
$$|G| = \sum_i \left[ G : \operatorname{C}_G(x_i)\right].$$
Observing that each element of the center $\operatorname{Z}(G)$ forms a conjugacy class containing just itself gives rise to the class equation:
$$|G| = |{\operatorname{Z}(G)}| + \sum_i \left[G : \operatorname{C}_G(x_i)\right],$$
where the sum is over a representative element from each conjugacy class that is not in the center.

Knowledge of the divisors of the group order $|G|$ can often be used to gain information about the order of the center or of the conjugacy classes.

==== Example ====
Consider a finite $p$-group $G$ (that is, a group with order $p^n,$ where $p$ is a prime number and $n > 0$). We are going to prove that every finite $p$-group has a center of size greater than 1.

Since the order of any conjugacy class of $G$ must divide the order of $G,$ it follows that each conjugacy class $H_i$ that is not in the center also has order some power of $p^{k_i},$ where $1 \leq k_i \leq n-1.$ But then the class equation requires that $|G| = p^n = |{\operatorname{Z}(G)}| + \sum_i p^{k_i}.$ From this we see that $p$ must divide $|{\operatorname{Z}(G)}|,$ so $|\operatorname{Z}(G)| > 1.$

In particular, when $n = 2$ we can further show that $G$ is abelian. From the foregoing, $|\operatorname{Z}(G)|,$ equals either $p$ or $p^2$ and, if $G$ were nonabelian, would have to equal $p.$ Furthermore, there would have to be an element $b$ not in $\operatorname{Z}(G)$. Its centralizer subgroup $\operatorname{C}_G(b)$ would, however, have to include both $b$ and all the elements of $\operatorname{Z}(G),$ implying $|\operatorname{C}_G(b)| = p^2.$ This contradicts $b\notin\operatorname{Z}(G).$ Hence $G$ is abelian and is, in fact, isomorphic either to a cyclic group of order $p^2$ or to the direct product of two cyclic groups of order $p.$

=== Average centralizer ===
By Burnside's lemma, the number of conjugacy classes of a finite group $G$ is equal to $\frac{1}{|G|} \sum_g |C_G(g)|$, the average size of the sets fixed by the elements of $G$ acting by conjugation, that is, the average size of the centralizers of elements of $G.$

== Conjugacy of subgroups and general subsets ==
More generally, given any subset $S \subseteq G$ ($S$ not necessarily a subgroup), define a subset $T \subseteq G$ to be conjugate to $S$ if there exists some $g \in G$ such that $T = gSg^{-1}.$ Let $\operatorname{Cl}(S)$ be the set of all subsets $T \subseteq G$ such that $T$ is conjugate to $S.$

Define a group action of $G$ on the set of all subsets of $G,$ by writing
$$g \cdot S := gSg^{-1}.$$
The result for the number of elements in the conjugacy class of an element generalizes to the case of subsets using an argument analogous to the one used previously: there is a one-to-one correspondence between elements of the conjugacy class of $S$ and cosets of $\operatorname{N}(S),$ the normalizer of $S,$ since, if $g, h \in G,$ then $gSg^{-1} = hSh^{-1}$ if and only if $g^{-1}h \in \operatorname{N}(S),$ in other words, if and only if $g \text{ and } h$ are in the same coset of $\operatorname{N}(S).$ As a result, the index of $\operatorname{N}(S)$ in $G$ equals the cardinality of $\operatorname{Cl}(S)$:
$$|{\operatorname{Cl}(S)}| = [G : N(S)].$$
By using $S = \{ a \},$ this formula specializes to the one given earlier for the number of elements in a conjugacy class since the normalizer of a singleton equals its centralizer.

The above is particularly useful when talking about subgroups of $G.$ The subgroups can thus be divided into conjugacy classes, with two subgroups belonging to the same class if and only if they are conjugate. Conjugate subgroups are isomorphic, but isomorphic subgroups need not be conjugate. For example, an abelian group may have two different subgroups which are isomorphic, but they are never conjugate.

== Geometric interpretation ==
Conjugacy classes in the fundamental group of a path-connected topological space can be thought of as equivalence classes of free loops under free homotopy.

== Conjugacy class and irreducible representations in finite group ==
In any finite group, the number of nonisomorphic irreducible representations over the complex numbers is precisely the number of conjugacy classes.

== See also ==
- Topological conjugacy – Concept in topology
- FC-group – Group in group theory mathematics
- Conjugacy-closed subgroup
