= Linear algebraic group =

Subgroup of the group of invertible n×n matrices

In mathematics, a linear algebraic group is a subgroup of the group of invertible $n\times n$ matrices (under matrix multiplication) that is defined by polynomial equations. An example is the orthogonal group, defined by the relation $M^TM = I_n$ where $M^T$ is the transpose of $M$.

Many Lie groups can be viewed as linear algebraic groups over the field of real or complex numbers. (For example, every compact Lie group can be regarded as a linear algebraic group over R (necessarily R-anisotropic and reductive), as can many noncompact groups such as the simple Lie group SL(n,R).) The simple Lie groups were classified by Wilhelm Killing and Élie Cartan in the 1880s and 1890s. At that time, no special use was made of the fact that the group structure can be defined by polynomials, that is, that these are algebraic groups. The founders of the theory of algebraic groups include Maurer, Chevalley, and Kolchin (1948). In the 1950s, Armand Borel constructed much of the theory of algebraic groups as it exists today.

One of the first uses for the theory was to define the Chevalley groups.

== Examples ==
For a positive integer $n$, the general linear group $GL(n)$ over a field $k$, consisting of all invertible $n\times n$ matrices, is a linear algebraic group over $k$. It contains the subgroups

$$U \subset B \subset GL(n)$$

consisting of matrices of the form, resp.,

$\left ( \begin{array}{cccc} 1 & * & \dots & * \\ 0 & 1 & \ddots & \vdots \\ \vdots & \ddots & \ddots & * \\ 0 & \dots & 0 & 1\end{array} \right )$ and $\left ( \begin{array}{cccc} * & * & \dots & * \\ 0 & * & \ddots & \vdots \\ \vdots & \ddots & \ddots & * \\ 0 & \dots & 0 & *\end{array} \right )$.

The group $U$ is an example of a unipotent linear algebraic group, the group $B$ is an example of a solvable algebraic group called the Borel subgroup of $GL(n)$. It is a consequence of the Lie-Kolchin theorem that any connected solvable subgroup of $\mathrm{GL}(n)$ is conjugated into $B$. Any unipotent subgroup can be conjugated into $U$.

Another algebraic subgroup of $\mathrm{GL}(n)$ is the special linear group $\mathrm{SL}(n)$ of matrices with determinant 1.

The group $\mathrm{GL}(1)$ is called the multiplicative group, usually denoted by $\mathbf G_{\mathrm m}$. The group of $k$-points $\mathbf G_{\mathrm m}(k)$ is the multiplicative group $k^*$ of nonzero elements of the field $k$. The additive group $\mathbf G_{\mathrm a}$, whose $k$-points are isomorphic to the additive group of $k$, can also be expressed as a matrix group, for example as the subgroup $U$ in $\mathrm{GL}(2)$ :

$$\begin{pmatrix}
1 & * \\
0 & 1
\end{pmatrix}.$$

These two basic examples of commutative linear algebraic groups, the multiplicative and additive groups, behave very differently in terms of their linear representations (as algebraic groups). Every representation of the multiplicative group $\mathbf G_{\mathrm m}$ is a direct sum of irreducible representations. (Its irreducible representations all have dimension 1, of the form $x \mapsto x^n$ for an integer $n$.) By contrast, the only irreducible representation of the additive group $\mathbf G_{\mathrm a}$ is the trivial representation. So every representation of $\mathbf G_{\mathrm a}$ (such as the 2-dimensional representation above) is an iterated extension of trivial representations, not a direct sum (unless the representation is trivial). The structure theory of linear algebraic groups analyzes any linear algebraic group in terms of these two basic groups and their generalizations, tori and unipotent groups, as discussed below.

== Definitions ==
For an algebraically closed field k, much of the structure of an algebraic variety X over k is encoded in its set X(k) of k-rational points, which allows an elementary definition of a linear algebraic group. First, define a function from the abstract group GL(n,k) to k to be regular if it can be written as a polynomial in the entries of an n×n matrix A and in 1/det(A), where det is the determinant. Then a linear algebraic group G over an algebraically closed field k is a subgroup G(k) of the abstract group GL(n,k) for some natural number n such that G(k) is defined by the vanishing of some set of regular functions.

For an arbitrary field k, algebraic varieties over k are defined as a special case of schemes over k. In that language, a linear algebraic group G over a field k is a smooth closed subgroup scheme of GL(n) over k for some natural number n. In particular, G is defined by the vanishing of some set of regular functions on GL(n) over k, and these functions must have the property that for every commutative k-algebra R, G(R) is a subgroup of the abstract group GL(n,R). (Thus an algebraic group G over k is not just the abstract group G(k), but rather the whole family of groups G(R) for commutative k-algebras R; this is the philosophy of describing a scheme by its functor of points.)

In either language, one has the notion of a homomorphism of linear algebraic groups. For example, when k is algebraically closed, a homomorphism from G ⊂ GL(m) to H ⊂ GL(n) is a homomorphism of abstract groups G(k) → H(k) which is defined by regular functions on G. This makes the linear algebraic groups over k into a category. In particular, this defines what it means for two linear algebraic groups to be isomorphic.

In the language of schemes, a linear algebraic group G over a field k is in particular a group scheme over k, meaning a scheme over k together with a k-point 1 ∈ G(k) and morphisms

$$m\colon G \times_k G \to G, \;  i\colon G \to G$$

over k which satisfy the usual axioms for the multiplication and inverse maps in a group (associativity, identity, inverses). A linear algebraic group is also smooth and of finite type over k, and it is affine (as a scheme). Conversely, every affine group scheme G of finite type over a field k has a faithful representation into GL(n) over k for some n. An example is the embedding of the additive group G_{a} into GL(2), as mentioned above. As a result, one can think of linear algebraic groups either as matrix groups or, more abstractly, as smooth affine group schemes over a field. (Some authors use "linear algebraic group" to mean any affine group scheme of finite type over a field.)

For a full understanding of linear algebraic groups, one has to consider more general (non-smooth) group schemes. For example, let k be an algebraically closed field of characteristic p > 0. Then the homomorphism f: G_{m} → G_{m} defined by x ↦ x^{p} induces an isomorphism of abstract groups k* → k*, but f is not an isomorphism of algebraic groups (because x^{1/p} is not a regular function). In the language of group schemes, there is a clearer reason why f is not an isomorphism: f is surjective, but it has nontrivial kernel, namely the group scheme μ_{p} of pth roots of unity. This issue does not arise in characteristic zero. Indeed, every group scheme of finite type over a field k of characteristic zero is smooth over k. A group scheme of finite type over any field k is smooth over k if and only if it is geometrically reduced, meaning that the base change $G_{\overline k}$ is reduced, where $\overline k$ is an algebraic closure of k.

Since an affine scheme X is determined by its ring O(X) of regular functions, an affine group scheme G over a field k is determined by the ring O(G) with its structure of a Hopf algebra (coming from the multiplication and inverse maps on G). This gives an equivalence of categories (reversing arrows) between affine group schemes over k and commutative Hopf algebras over k. For example, the Hopf algebra corresponding to the multiplicative group G_{m} = GL(1) is the Laurent polynomial ring k[x, x^{−1}], with comultiplication given by

$$x \mapsto x \otimes x.$$

=== Basic notions ===
For a linear algebraic group G over a field k, the identity component G^{o} (the connected component containing the point 1) is a normal subgroup of finite index. So there is a group extension

$$1 \to G^\circ \to G \to F \to 1,$$

where F is a finite algebraic group. (For k algebraically closed, F can be identified with an abstract finite group.) Because of this, the study of algebraic groups mostly focuses on connected groups.

Various notions from abstract group theory can be extended to linear algebraic groups. It is straightforward to define what it means for a linear algebraic group to be commutative, nilpotent, or solvable, by analogy with the definitions in abstract group theory. For example, a linear algebraic group is solvable if it has a composition series of linear algebraic subgroups such that the quotient groups are commutative. Also, the normalizer, the center, and the centralizer of a closed subgroup H of a linear algebraic group G are naturally viewed as closed subgroup schemes of G. If they are smooth over k, then they are linear algebraic groups as defined above.

One may ask to what extent the properties of a connected linear algebraic group G over a field k are determined by the abstract group G(k). A useful result in this direction is that if the field k is perfect (for example, of characteristic zero), or if G is reductive (as defined below), then G is unirational over k. Therefore, if in addition k is infinite, the group G(k) is Zariski dense in G. For example, under the assumptions mentioned, G is commutative, nilpotent, or solvable if and only if G(k) has the corresponding property.

The assumption of connectedness cannot be omitted in these results. For example, let G be the group μ_{3} ⊂ GL(1) of cube roots of unity over the rational numbers Q. Then G is a linear algebraic group over Q for which G(Q) = 1 is not Zariski dense in G, because $G(\overline {\mathbf Q})$ is a group of order 3.

Over an algebraically closed field, there is a stronger result about algebraic groups as algebraic varieties: every connected linear algebraic group over an algebraically closed field is a rational variety.

== The Lie algebra of an algebraic group ==
The Lie algebra $\mathfrak g$ of an algebraic group G can be defined in several equivalent ways: as the tangent space T_{1}(G) at the identity element 1 ∈ G(k), or as the space of left-invariant derivations. If k is algebraically closed, a derivation D: O(G) → O(G) over k of the coordinate ring of G is left-invariant if

$$D \lambda_x = \lambda_x D$$

for every x in G(k), where λ_{x}: O(G) → O(G) is induced by left multiplication by x. For an arbitrary field k, left invariance of a derivation is defined as an analogous equality of two linear maps O(G) → O(G) ⊗O(G). The Lie bracket of two derivations is defined by [D_{1}, D_{2}] =D_{1}D_{2} − D_{2}D_{1}.

The passage from G to $\mathfrak g$ is thus a process of differentiation. For an element x ∈ G(k), the derivative at 1 ∈ G(k) of the conjugation map G → G, g ↦ xgx^{−1}, is an automorphism of $\mathfrak g$, giving the adjoint representation:

$$\operatorname{Ad}\colon G \to \operatorname{Aut}(\mathfrak g).$$

Over a field of characteristic zero, a connected subgroup H of a linear algebraic group G is uniquely determined by its Lie algebra $\mathfrak h \subset \mathfrak g$. But not every Lie subalgebra of $\mathfrak g$ corresponds to an algebraic subgroup of G, as one sees in the example of the torus G = (G_{m})^{2} over C. In positive characteristic, there can be many different connected subgroups of a group G with the same Lie algebra (again, the torus G = (G_{m})^{2} provides examples). For these reasons, although the Lie algebra of an algebraic group is important, the structure theory of algebraic groups requires more global tools.

== Semisimple and unipotent elements ==
For an algebraically closed field k, a matrix g in GL(n,k) is called semisimple if it is diagonalizable, and unipotent if the matrix g − 1 is nilpotent. Equivalently, g is unipotent if all eigenvalues of g are equal to 1. The Jordan canonical form for matrices implies that every element g of GL(n,k) can be written uniquely as a product g = g_{ss}g_{u} such that g_{ss} is semisimple, g_{u} is unipotent, and g_{ss} and g_{u} commute with each other.

For any field k, an element g of GL(n,k) is said to be semisimple if it becomes diagonalizable over the algebraic closure of k. If the field k is perfect, then the semisimple and unipotent parts of g also lie in GL(n,k). Finally, for any linear algebraic group G ⊂ GL(n) over a field k, define a k-point of G to be semisimple or unipotent if it is semisimple or unipotent in GL(n,k). (These properties are in fact independent of the choice of a faithful representation of G.) If the field k is perfect, then the semisimple and unipotent parts of a k-point of G are automatically in G. That is (the Jordan decomposition): every element g of G(k) can be written uniquely as a product g = g_{ss}g_{u} in G(k) such that g_{ss} is semisimple, g_{u} is unipotent, and g_{ss} and g_{u} commute with each other. This reduces the problem of describing the conjugacy classes in G(k) to the semisimple and unipotent cases.

== Tori ==
A torus over an algebraically closed field k means a group isomorphic to (G_{m})^{n}, the product of n copies of the multiplicative group over k, for some natural number n. For a linear algebraic group G, a maximal torus in G means a torus in G that is not contained in any bigger torus. For example, the group of diagonal matrices in GL(n) over k is a maximal torus in GL(n), isomorphic to (G_{m})^{n}. A basic result of the theory is that any two maximal tori in a group G over an algebraically closed field k are conjugate by some element of G(k). The rank of G means the dimension of any maximal torus.

For an arbitrary field k, a torus T over k means a linear algebraic group over k whose base change $T_{\overline k}$ to the algebraic closure of k is isomorphic to (G_{m})^{n} over $\overline k$, for some natural number n. A split torus over k means a group isomorphic to (G_{m})^{n} over k for some n. An example of a non-split torus over the real numbers R is

$$T=\{(x,y)\in A^2_{\mathbf{R}}: x^2+y^2=1\},$$

with group structure given by the formula for multiplying complex numbers x+iy. Here T is a torus of dimension 1 over R. It is not split, because its group of real points T(R) is the circle group, which is not isomorphic even as an abstract group to G_{m}(R) = R*.

Every point of a torus over a field k is semisimple. Conversely, if G is a connected linear algebraic group such that every element of $G(\overline k)$ is semisimple, then G is a torus.

For a linear algebraic group G over a general field k, one cannot expect all maximal tori in G over k to be conjugate by elements of G(k). For example, both the multiplicative group G_{m} and the circle group T above occur as maximal tori in SL(2) over R. However, it is always true that any two maximal split tori in G over k (meaning split tori in G that are not contained in a bigger split torus) are conjugate by some element of G(k). As a result, it makes sense to define the k-rank or split rank of a group G over k as the dimension of any maximal split torus in G over k.

For any maximal torus T in a linear algebraic group G over a field k, Grothendieck showed that $T_{\overline k}$ is a maximal torus in $G_{\overline k}$. It follows that any two maximal tori in G over a field k have the same dimension, although they need not be isomorphic.

== Unipotent groups ==
Let U_{n} be the group of upper-triangular matrices in GL(n) with diagonal entries equal to 1, over a field k. A group scheme over a field k (for example, a linear algebraic group) is called unipotent if it is isomorphic to a closed subgroup scheme of U_{n} for some n. It is straightforward to check that the group U_{n} is nilpotent. As a result, every unipotent group scheme is nilpotent.

A linear algebraic group G over a field k is unipotent if and only if every element of $G(\overline{k})$ is unipotent.

The group B_{n} of upper-triangular matrices in GL(n) is a semidirect product

$$B_n = T_n \ltimes U_n,$$

where T_{n} is the diagonal torus (G_{m})^{n}. More generally, every connected solvable linear algebraic group is a semidirect product of a torus with a unipotent group, T ⋉ U.

A smooth connected unipotent group over a perfect field k (for example, an algebraically closed field) has a composition series with all quotient groups isomorphic to the additive group G_{a}.

== Borel subgroups ==
The Borel subgroups are important for the structure theory of linear algebraic groups. For a linear algebraic group G over an algebraically closed field k, a Borel subgroup of G means a maximal smooth connected solvable subgroup. For example, one Borel subgroup of GL(n) is the subgroup B of upper-triangular matrices (all entries below the diagonal are zero).

A basic result of the theory is that any two Borel subgroups of a connected group G over an algebraically closed field k are conjugate by some element of G(k). (A standard proof uses the Borel fixed-point theorem: for a connected solvable group G acting on a proper variety X over an algebraically closed field k, there is a k-point in X which is fixed by the action of G.) The conjugacy of Borel subgroups in GL(n) amounts to the Lie–Kolchin theorem: every smooth connected solvable subgroup of GL(n) is conjugate to a subgroup of the upper-triangular subgroup in GL(n).

For an arbitrary field k, a Borel subgroup B of G is defined to be a subgroup over k such that, over an algebraic closure $\overline k$ of k, $B_{\overline k}$ is a Borel subgroup of $G_{\overline k}$. Thus G may or may not have a Borel subgroup over k.

For a closed subgroup scheme H of G, the quotient space G/H is a smooth quasi-projective scheme over k. A smooth subgroup P of a connected group G is called parabolic if G/P is projective over k (or equivalently, proper over k). An important property of Borel subgroups B is that G/B is a projective variety, called the flag variety of G. That is, Borel subgroups are parabolic subgroups. More precisely, for k algebraically closed, the Borel subgroups are exactly the minimal parabolic subgroups of G; conversely, every subgroup containing a Borel subgroup is parabolic. So one can list all parabolic subgroups of G (up to conjugation by G(k)) by listing all the linear algebraic subgroups of G that contain a fixed Borel subgroup. For example, the subgroups P ⊂ GL(3) over k that contain the Borel subgroup B of upper-triangular matrices are B itself, the whole group GL(3), and the intermediate subgroups

$$\left \{ \begin{bmatrix}
* & * & * \\
0 & * & * \\
0 & * & *
\end{bmatrix} \right \}$$
and
$$\left \{ \begin{bmatrix}
* & * & * \\
* & * & * \\
0 & 0 & *
\end{bmatrix} \right \}.$$

The corresponding projective homogeneous varieties GL(3)/P are (respectively): the flag manifold of all chains of linear subspaces

$$0\subset V_1\subset V_2\subset A^3_k$$

with V_{i} of dimension i; a point; the projective space P^{2} of lines (1-dimensional linear subspaces) in A^{3}; and the dual projective space P^{2} of planes in A^{3}.

== Semisimple and reductive groups ==
A connected linear algebraic group G over an algebraically closed field is called semisimple if every smooth connected solvable normal subgroup of G is trivial. More generally, a connected linear algebraic group G over an algebraically closed field is called reductive if every smooth connected unipotent normal subgroup of G is trivial. (Some authors do not require reductive groups to be connected.) A semisimple group is reductive. A group G over an arbitrary field k is called semisimple or reductive if $G_{\overline k}$ is semisimple or reductive. For example, the group SL(n) of n × n matrices with determinant 1 over any field k is semisimple, whereas a nontrivial torus is reductive but not semisimple. Likewise, GL(n) is reductive but not semisimple (because its center G_{m} is a nontrivial smooth connected solvable normal subgroup).

Every compact connected Lie group has a complexification, which is a complex reductive algebraic group. In fact, this construction gives a one-to-one correspondence between compact connected Lie groups and complex reductive groups, up to isomorphism.

A linear algebraic group G over a field k is called simple (or k-simple) if it is semisimple, nontrivial, and every smooth connected normal subgroup of G over k is trivial or equal to G. (Some authors call this property "almost simple".) This differs slightly from the terminology for abstract groups, in that a simple algebraic group may have nontrivial center (although the center must be finite). For example, for any integer n at least 2 and any field k, the group SL(n) over k is simple, and its center is the group scheme μ_{n} of nth roots of unity.

Every connected linear algebraic group G over a perfect field k is (in a unique way) an extension of a reductive group R by a smooth connected unipotent group U, called the unipotent radical of G:

$$1\to U\to G\to R\to 1.$$

If k has characteristic zero, then one has the more precise Levi decomposition: every connected linear algebraic group G over k is a semidirect product $R\ltimes U$ of a reductive group by a unipotent group.

== Classification of reductive groups ==
Reductive groups include the most important linear algebraic groups in practice, such as the classical groups: GL(n), SL(n), the orthogonal groups SO(n) and the symplectic groups Sp(2n). On the other hand, the definition of reductive groups is quite "negative", and it is not clear that one can expect to say much about them. Remarkably, Claude Chevalley gave a complete classification of the reductive groups over an algebraically closed field: they are determined by root data. In particular, simple groups over an algebraically closed field k are classified (up to quotients by finite central subgroup schemes) by their Dynkin diagrams. It is striking that this classification is independent of the characteristic of k. For example, the exceptional Lie groups G_{2}, F_{4}, E_{6}, E_{7}, and E_{8} can be defined in any characteristic (and even as group schemes over Z). The classification of finite simple groups says that most finite simple groups arise as the group of k-points of a simple algebraic group over a finite field k, or as minor variants of that construction.

Every reductive group over a field is the quotient by a finite central subgroup scheme of the product of a torus and some simple groups. For example,

$$GL(n)\cong (G_m\times SL(n))/\mu_n.$$

For an arbitrary field k, a reductive group G is called split if it contains a split maximal torus over k (that is, a split torus in G which remains maximal over an algebraic closure of k). For example, GL(n) is a split reductive group over any field k. Chevalley showed that the classification of split reductive groups is the same over any field. By contrast, the classification of arbitrary reductive groups can be hard, depending on the base field. For example, every nondegenerate quadratic form q over a field k determines a reductive group SO(q), and every central simple algebra A over k determines a reductive group SL_{1}(A) (of elements with reduced norm 1). As a result, the problem of classifying reductive groups over k essentially includes the problem of classifying all quadratic forms over k or all central simple algebras over k. These problems are easy for k algebraically closed, and they are understood for some other fields such as number fields, but for arbitrary fields there are many open questions.

== Applications ==
=== Representation theory ===
One reason for the importance of reductive groups comes from representation theory. Every irreducible representation of a unipotent group is trivial. More generally, for any linear algebraic group G written as an extension

$$1\to U\to G\to R\to 1$$

with U unipotent and R reductive, every irreducible representation of G factors through R. This focuses attention on the representation theory of reductive groups. (To be clear, the representations considered here are representations of G as an algebraic group. Thus, for a group G over a field k, the representations are on k-vector spaces, and the action of G is given by regular functions. It is an important but different problem to classify continuous representations of the group G(R) for a real reductive group G, or similar problems over other fields.)

Chevalley showed that the irreducible representations of a split reductive group over a field k are finite-dimensional, and they are indexed by dominant weights. This is the same as what happens in the representation theory of compact connected Lie groups, or the finite-dimensional representation theory of complex semisimple Lie algebras. For k of characteristic zero, all these theories are essentially equivalent. In particular, every representation of a reductive group G over a field of characteristic zero is a direct sum of irreducible representations, and if G is split, the characters of the irreducible representations are given by the Weyl character formula. The Borel–Weil theorem gives a geometric construction of the irreducible representations of a reductive group G in characteristic zero, as spaces of sections of line bundles over the flag manifold G/B.

The representation theory of reductive groups (other than tori) over a field of positive characteristic p is less well understood. In this situation, a representation need not be a direct sum of irreducible representations. And although irreducible representations are indexed by dominant weights, the dimensions and characters of the irreducible representations are known only in some cases. Andersen, Jantzen and Soergel (1994) determined these characters (proving Lusztig's conjecture) when the characteristic p is sufficiently large compared to the Coxeter number of the group. For small primes p, there is not even a precise conjecture.

=== Group actions and geometric invariant theory ===
An action of a linear algebraic group G on a variety (or scheme) X over a field k is a morphism

$$G \times_k X \to X$$

that satisfies the axioms of a group action. As in other types of group theory, it is important to study group actions, since groups arise naturally as symmetries of geometric objects.

Part of the theory of group actions is geometric invariant theory, which aims to construct a quotient variety X/G, describing the set of orbits of a linear algebraic group G on X as an algebraic variety. Various complications arise. For example, if X is an affine variety, then one can try to construct X/G as Spec of the ring of invariants O(X)^{G}. However, Masayoshi Nagata showed that the ring of invariants need not be finitely generated as a k-algebra (and so Spec of the ring is a scheme but not a variety), a negative answer to Hilbert's 14th problem. In the positive direction, the ring of invariants is finitely generated if G is reductive, by Haboush's theorem, proved in characteristic zero by Hilbert and Nagata.

Geometric invariant theory involves further subtleties when a reductive group G acts on a projective variety X. In particular, the theory defines open subsets of "stable" and "semistable" points in X, with the quotient morphism only defined on the set of semistable points.

== Related notions ==
Linear algebraic groups admit variants in several directions. Dropping the existence of the inverse map $i\colon G \to G$, one obtains the notion of a linear algebraic monoid.

=== Lie groups ===
For a linear algebraic group G over the real numbers R, the group of real points G(R) is a Lie group, essentially because real polynomials, which describe the multiplication on G, are smooth functions. Likewise, for a linear algebraic group G over C, G(C) is a complex Lie group. Much of the theory of algebraic groups was developed by analogy with Lie groups.

There are several reasons why a Lie group may not have the structure of a linear algebraic group over R.

- A Lie group with an infinite group of components G/G^{o} cannot be realized as a linear algebraic group.
- An algebraic group G over R may be connected as an algebraic group while the Lie group G(R) is not connected, and likewise for simply connected groups. For example, the algebraic group SL(2) is simply connected over any field, whereas the Lie group SL(2,R) has fundamental group isomorphic to the integers Z. The double cover H of SL(2,R), known as the metaplectic group, is a Lie group that cannot be viewed as a linear algebraic group over R. More strongly, H has no faithful finite-dimensional representation.
- Anatoly Maltsev showed that every simply connected nilpotent Lie group can be viewed as a unipotent algebraic group G over R in a unique way. (As a variety, G is isomorphic to affine space of some dimension over R.) By contrast, there are simply connected solvable Lie groups that cannot be viewed as real algebraic groups. For example, the universal cover H of the semidirect product S^{1} ⋉ R^{2} has center isomorphic to Z, which is not a linear algebraic group, and so H cannot be viewed as a linear algebraic group over R.

=== Abelian varieties ===
Algebraic groups which are not affine behave very differently. In particular, a smooth connected group scheme which is a projective variety over a field is called an abelian variety. In contrast to linear algebraic groups, every abelian variety is commutative. Nonetheless, abelian varieties have a rich theory. Even the case of elliptic curves (abelian varieties of dimension 1) is central to number theory, with applications including the proof of Fermat's Last Theorem.

=== Tannakian categories ===
The finite-dimensional representations of an algebraic group G, together with the tensor product of representations, form a tannakian category Rep_{G}. In fact, tannakian categories with a "fiber functor" over a field are equivalent to affine group schemes. (Every affine group scheme over a field k is pro-algebraic in the sense that it is an inverse limit of affine group schemes of finite type over k.) For example, the Mumford–Tate group and the motivic Galois group are constructed using this formalism. Certain properties of a (pro-)algebraic group G can be read from its category of representations. For example, over a field of characteristic zero, Rep_{G} is a semisimple category if and only if the identity component of G is pro-reductive.

== See also ==
- Linear group
- The groups of Lie type are the finite simple groups constructed from simple algebraic groups over finite fields.
- Lang's theorem
- Generalized flag variety, Bruhat decomposition, BN pair, Weyl group, Cartan subgroup, group of adjoint type, parabolic induction
- Real form (Lie theory), Satake diagram
- Adelic algebraic group, Weil's conjecture on Tamagawa numbers
- Langlands classification, Langlands program, geometric Langlands program
- Torsor, nonabelian cohomology, special group, cohomological invariant, essential dimension, Kneser–Tits conjecture, Serre's conjecture II
- Pseudo-reductive group
- Differential Galois theory
- Distribution on a linear algebraic group
