= Serre's conjecture II =

Unsolved problem in number theory

Unsolved problem in mathematics
Must the Galois cohomology set of a simply connected, semisimple algebraic group over a perfect field of cohomological dimension at most 2 always equal zero?
More unsolved problems in mathematics

In mathematics, specifically number theory, Serre's conjecture II is the statement that if G is a simply connected, semisimple algebraic group over a perfect field F of cohomological dimension at most 2, then the Galois cohomology set H^{1}(F, G) is zero. It was proposed by Jean-Pierre Serre in 1962, as an higher-dimension equivalent of his conjecture I (which was later proven).

A converse of the conjecture holds: if the field F is perfect and if the cohomology set H^{1}(F, G) is zero for every semisimple, simply connected algebraic group G, then the p-cohomological dimension of F is at most 2 for every prime p. The conjecture has been proven for all groups over all perfect fields; however, it remains open for anisotropic E6, E7 and E8 groups and trialitarian D4 group over imperfect fields.

== Known cases ==
The conjecture holds in the case where F is a local field (such as p-adic field), a global field with no real embeddings (such as Q(√−1)) or a totally imaginary number field. This is a special case of the Kneser–Harder–Chernousov Hasse principle for algebraic groups over global fields. (Note that such fields do indeed have cohomological dimension at most 2.) The conjecture holds when F is finitely generated over complex numbers and has transcendence degree at most 2. The conjecture also holds for l-special fields, complete valued fields and function fields.

The conjecture is known to hold for certain groups G. For special linear groups, it is a consequence of the Merkurjev–Suslin theorem. Building on this result, the conjecture holds if G is a classical group (type A, B, C or D with no triality); or a group of type F4 and G2 on a perfect field. The conjecture also holds for classical groups over imperfect fields. Over perfect fields, the conjecture also holds if G is an isotropic or quasi-split exceptional group (except for E8); or a pseudo-reductive group.
