= Borel–Weil–Bott theorem =

Basic result in the representation theory of Lie groups

In mathematics, the Borel–Weil–Bott theorem is a basic result in the representation theory of Lie groups, showing how a family of representations can be obtained from holomorphic sections of certain complex vector bundles, and, more generally, from higher sheaf cohomology groups associated to such bundles. It is built on the earlier Borel–Weil theorem of Armand Borel and André Weil, dealing just with the space of sections (the zeroth cohomology group), the extension to higher cohomology groups being provided by Raoul Bott. One can equivalently, through Serre's GAGA, view this as a result in complex algebraic geometry in the Zariski topology.

== Formulation ==
Let G be a semisimple Lie group or algebraic group over $\mathbb C$, and fix a maximal torus T along with a Borel subgroup B which contains T. Let λ be an integral weight of T; λ defines in a natural way a one-dimensional representation C_{λ} of B, by pulling back the representation on T = B/U, where U is the unipotent radical of B. Since we can think of the projection map G → G/B as a principal B-bundle, for each C_{λ} we get an associated fiber bundle L_{−λ} on G/B (note the sign), which is obviously a line bundle. Identifying L_{λ} with its sheaf of holomorphic sections, we consider the sheaf cohomology groups $H^i( G/B, \, L_\lambda )$. Since G acts on the total space of the bundle $L_\lambda$ by bundle automorphisms, this action naturally gives a G-module structure on these groups; and the Borel–Weil–Bott theorem gives an explicit description of these groups as G-modules.

We first need to describe the Weyl group action centered at $- \rho$. For any integral weight λ and w in the Weyl group W, we set $w*\lambda := w( \lambda + \rho ) - \rho \,$, where ρ denotes the half-sum of positive roots of G. It is straightforward to check that this defines a group action, although this action is not linear, unlike the usual Weyl group action. Also, a weight μ is said to be dominant if $\mu( \alpha^\vee ) \geq 0$ for all simple roots α. Let ℓ denote the length function on W.

Given an integral weight λ, one of two cases occur:

1. There is no $w \in W$ such that $w*\lambda$ is dominant, equivalently, there exists a nonidentity $w \in W$ such that $w * \lambda = \lambda$; or
2. There is a unique $w \in W$ such that $w * \lambda$ is dominant.

The theorem states that in the first case, we have

$H^i( G/B, \, L_\lambda ) = 0$ for all i;

and in the second case, we have

$H^i( G/B, \, L_\lambda ) = 0$ for all $i \neq \ell(w)$, while

$H^{ \ell(w) }( G/B, \, L_\lambda )$ is the dual of the irreducible highest-weight representation of G with highest weight $w * \lambda$.

Case (1) above occurs if and only if $(\lambda+\rho)( \beta^\vee ) = 0$ for some positive root β. Also, we obtain the classical Borel–Weil theorem as a special case of this theorem by taking λ to be dominant and w to be the identity element $e \in W$.

== Example ==
For example, consider G = SL_{2}(C), for which G/B is the Riemann sphere, an integral weight is specified simply by an integer n, and ρ = 1. The line bundle L_{n} is ${\mathcal O}(n)$, whose sections are the homogeneous polynomials of degree n (i.e. the binary forms). As a representation of G, the sections can be written as Sym^{n}(C^{2})*, and is canonically isomorphic to Sym^{n}(C^{2}).

This gives us at a stroke the representation theory of $\mathfrak{sl}_2(\mathbf{C})$: $\Gamma({\mathcal O}(1))$ is the standard representation, and $\Gamma({\mathcal O}(n))$ is its nth symmetric power. We even have a unified description of the action of the Lie algebra, derived from its realization as vector fields on the Riemann sphere: if H, X, Y are the standard generators of $\mathfrak{sl}_2(\mathbf{C})$, then

$$\begin{align}
H & = x\frac{\partial}{\partial x}-y\frac{\partial}{\partial y}, \\[5pt]
X & = x\frac{\partial}{\partial y}, \\[5pt]
Y & = y\frac{\partial}{\partial x}.
\end{align}$$

== Positive characteristic ==
One also has a weaker form of this theorem in positive characteristic. Namely, let G be a semisimple algebraic group over an algebraically closed field of characteristic $p > 0$. Then it remains true that $H^i( G/B, \, L_\lambda ) = 0$ for all i if λ is a weight such that $w*\lambda$ is non-dominant for all $w \in W$ as long as λ is "close to zero". This is known as the Kempf vanishing theorem. However, the other statements of the theorem do not remain valid in this setting.

More explicitly, let λ be a dominant integral weight; then it is still true that $H^i( G/B, \, L_\lambda ) = 0$ for all $i > 0$, but it is no longer true that this G-module is simple in general, although it does contain the unique highest weight module of highest weight λ as a G-submodule. If λ is an arbitrary integral weight, it is in fact a large unsolved problem in representation theory to describe the cohomology modules $H^i( G/B, \, L_\lambda )$ in general. Unlike over $\mathbb{C}$, Mumford gave an example showing that it need not be the case for a fixed λ that these modules are all zero except in a single degree i.

== Borel–Weil theorem ==
The Borel–Weil theorem provides a concrete model for irreducible representations of compact Lie groups and irreducible holomorphic representations of complex semisimple Lie groups. These representations are realized in the spaces of global sections of holomorphic line bundles on the flag manifold of the group. The Borel–Weil–Bott theorem is its generalization to higher cohomology spaces. The theorem dates back to the early 1950s and can be found in Serre (1954) and Tits (1955).

=== Statement of the theorem ===
The theorem can be stated either for a complex semisimple Lie group G or for its compact form K. Let G be a connected complex semisimple Lie group, B a Borel subgroup of G, and X = G/B the flag variety. In this scenario, X is a complex manifold and a nonsingular algebraic G-variety. The flag variety can also be described as a compact homogeneous space K/T, where T = K ∩ B is a (compact) Cartan subgroup of K. An integral weight λ determines a G-equivariant holomorphic line bundle L_{λ} on X and the group G acts on its space of global sections,

$$\Gamma(G/B,L_\lambda).\$$

The Borel–Weil theorem states that if λ is a dominant integral weight then this representation is a holomorphic irreducible highest weight representation of G with highest weight λ. Its restriction to K is an irreducible unitary representation of K with highest weight λ, and each irreducible unitary representation of K is obtained in this way for a unique value of λ. (A holomorphic representation of a complex Lie group is one for which the corresponding Lie algebra representation is complex linear.)

=== Concrete description ===
The weight λ gives rise to a character (one-dimensional representation) of the Borel subgroup B, which is denoted χ_{λ}. Holomorphic sections of the holomorphic line bundle L_{λ} over G/B may be described more concretely as holomorphic maps

$$f: G\to \mathbb{C}_{\lambda}: f(gb)=\chi_{\lambda}(b^{-1})f(g)$$

for all g ∈ G and b ∈ B.

The action of G on these sections is given by

$$g\cdot f(h)=f(g^{-1}h)$$

for g, h ∈ G.

=== Example ===
Let G be the complex special linear group SL(2, C), with a Borel subgroup consisting of upper triangular matrices with determinant one. Integral weights for G may be identified with integers, with dominant weights corresponding to nonnegative integers, and the corresponding characters χ_{n} of B have the form

$$\chi_n
\begin{pmatrix}
a & b\\
0 & a^{-1}
\end{pmatrix}=a^n.$$

The flag variety G/B may be identified with the complex projective line CP^{1} with homogeneous coordinates X, Y and the space of the global sections of the line bundle L_{n} is identified with the space of homogeneous polynomials of degree n on C^{2}. For n ≥ 0, this space has dimension n + 1 and forms an irreducible representation under the standard action of G on the polynomial algebra C[X, Y]. Weight vectors are given by monomials

$$X^i Y^{n-i}, \quad 0\leq i\leq n$$

of weights 2i − n, and the highest weight vector X^{n} has weight n.

== See also ==
- Theorem of the highest weight
