= Reductive group =

Concept in mathematics

In mathematics, a reductive group is a type of linear algebraic group over a field. One definition is that a connected linear algebraic group G over a perfect field is reductive if it has a representation that has a finite kernel and is semisimple, i.e. a direct sum of irreducible representations. Reductive groups include some of the most important groups in mathematics, such as the general linear group GL(n) of invertible matrices, the special orthogonal group SO(n), and the symplectic group Sp(2n). Simple algebraic groups and (more generally) semisimple algebraic groups are reductive.

Claude Chevalley showed that the classification of reductive groups is the same over any algebraically closed field. In particular, the simple algebraic groups are classified by Dynkin diagrams, as in the theory of compact Lie groups or complex semisimple Lie algebras. Reductive groups over an arbitrary field are harder to classify, but for many fields such as the real numbers R or a number field, the classification is well understood. The classification of finite simple groups says that most finite simple groups arise as the group G(k) of k-rational points of a simple algebraic group G over a finite field k, or as minor variants of that construction.

Reductive groups have a rich representation theory in various contexts. One can study the representations of a reductive group G over a field k as an algebraic group, which are actions of G on k-vector spaces. Also, one can study the complex representations of the group G(k) when k is a finite field, or the infinite-dimensional unitary representations of a real reductive group, or the automorphic representations of an adelic algebraic group. The structure theory of reductive groups is used in all these areas.

== Definitions ==
A linear algebraic group over a field k is defined as a smooth closed subgroup scheme of GL(n) over k, for some positive integer n. Equivalently, a linear algebraic group over k is a smooth affine group scheme over k.

=== With the unipotent radical ===
A connected linear algebraic group $G$ over an algebraically closed field is called semisimple if every smooth connected solvable normal subgroup of $G$ is trivial. More generally, a connected linear algebraic group $G$ over an algebraically closed field is called reductive if the largest smooth connected unipotent normal subgroup of G is trivial. This normal subgroup is called the unipotent radical and is denoted R_{u}(G). (Some authors do not require reductive groups to be connected.) A group G over an arbitrary field k is called semisimple or reductive if the base change $G_{\overline k}$ is semisimple or reductive, where $\bar{k}$ is an algebraic closure of k. (This is equivalent to the definition of reductive groups in the introduction when k is perfect.) Any torus over k, such as the multiplicative group G_{m}, is reductive.

=== With representation theory ===
Over fields of characteristic zero another equivalent definition of a reductive group is a connected group G admitting a faithful semisimple representation which remains semisimple over its algebraic closure k^{al}. ^{page 424}.

=== Simple reductive groups ===
A linear algebraic group G over a field k is called simple (or k-simple) if it is semisimple, nontrivial, and every smooth connected normal subgroup of G over k is trivial or equal to G. (Some authors call this property "almost simple".) This differs slightly from the terminology for abstract groups, in that a simple algebraic group may have nontrivial center (although the center must be finite). For example, for any integer n at least 2 and any field k, the group SL(n) over k is simple, and its center is the group scheme μ_{n} of n-th roots of unity.

A central isogeny of reductive groups is a surjective homomorphism with kernel a finite central subgroup scheme. Every reductive group over a field admits a central isogeny from the product of a torus and some simple groups. For example, over any field k,

$$\operatorname{GL}(n)\cong (G_m\times \operatorname{SL}(n))/\mu_n.$$

It is slightly awkward that the definition of a reductive group over a field involves passage to the algebraic closure. For a perfect field k, that can be avoided: a linear algebraic group G over k is reductive if and only if every smooth connected unipotent normal k-subgroup of G is trivial. For an arbitrary field, the latter property defines a pseudo-reductive group, which is somewhat more general.

=== Split-reductive groups ===
A reductive group G over a field k is called split if it contains a split maximal torus T over k; that is, a split torus in G whose base change to $\bar{k}$ is a maximal torus in $G_{\bar{k}}$. It is equivalent to say that T is a split torus in G that is maximal among all k-tori in G. These kinds of groups are useful because their classification can be described through combinatorical data called root data.

== Examples ==
=== GL_{n} and SL_{n} ===
A fundamental example of a reductive group is the general linear group $\text{GL}_n$ of invertible n × n matrices over a field k, for a natural number n. In particular, the multiplicative group G_{m} is the group GL(1), and so its group G_{m}(k) of k-rational points is the group k^{×} of nonzero elements of k under multiplication. Another reductive group is the special linear group SL(n) over a field k, the subgroup of matrices with determinant 1. In fact, SL(n) is a simple algebraic group for n at least 2.

=== O(n), SO(n), and Sp(n) ===
An important simple group is the symplectic group Sp(2n) over a field k, the subgroup of GL(2n) that preserves a nondegenerate alternating bilinear form on the vector space k^{2n}. Likewise, the orthogonal group O(q) is the subgroup of the general linear group that preserves a nondegenerate quadratic form q on a vector space over a field k. The algebraic group O(q) has two connected components, and its identity component SO(q) is reductive, in fact simple for q of dimension n at least 3. (For k of characteristic 2 and n odd, the group scheme O(q) is in fact connected but not smooth over k. The simple group SO(q) can always be defined as the maximal smooth connected subgroup of O(q) over k.) When k is algebraically closed, any two (nondegenerate) quadratic forms of the same dimension are isomorphic, and so it is reasonable to call this group SO(n). For a general field k, different quadratic forms of dimension n can yield non-isomorphic simple groups SO(q) over k, although they all have the same base change to the algebraic closure $\bar{k}$.

=== Tori ===
The group $\mathbb{G}_m$ and products of it are called the algebraic tori. They are examples of reductive groups since they embed in $\text{GL}_n$ through the diagonal, and from this representation, their unipotent radical is trivial. For example, $\mathbb{G}_m\times \mathbb {G}_m$ embeds in $\text{GL}_2$ from the map

$$(a_1,a_2) \mapsto \begin{bmatrix}
a_1 & 0 \\
0 & a_2
\end{bmatrix}.$$

=== Non-examples ===
- Any unipotent group is not reductive since its unipotent radical is itself. This includes the additive group $\mathbb{G}_a$.
- The Borel group $B_n$ of $\text{GL}_n$ has a non-trivial unipotent radical $\mathbb{U}_n$ of upper-triangular matrices with $1$ on the diagonal. This is an example of a non-reductive group which is not unipotent.

==== Associated reductive group ====
Note that the normality of the unipotent radical $R_u(G)$ implies that the quotient group $G/R_u(G)$ is reductive. For example,

$B_n/(R_u(B_n)) \cong \prod^n_{i=1} \mathbb{G}_m.$

== Other characterizations of reductive groups ==
Every compact connected Lie group has a complexification, which is a complex reductive algebraic group. In fact, this construction gives a one-to-one correspondence between compact connected Lie groups and complex reductive groups, up to isomorphism. For a compact Lie group K with complexification G, the inclusion from K into the complex reductive group G(C) is a homotopy equivalence, with respect to the classical topology on G(C). For example, the inclusion from the unitary group U(n) to GL(n,C) is a homotopy equivalence.

For a reductive group G over a field of characteristic zero, all finite-dimensional representations of G (as an algebraic group) are completely reducible, that is, they are direct sums of irreducible representations. That is the source of the name "reductive". Note, however, that complete reducibility fails for reductive groups in positive characteristic (apart from tori). In more detail: an affine group scheme G of finite type over a field k is called linearly reductive if its finite-dimensional representations are completely reducible. For k of characteristic zero, G is linearly reductive if and only if the identity component G^{o} of G is reductive. For k of characteristic p > 0, however, Masayoshi Nagata showed that G is linearly reductive if and only if G^{o} is of multiplicative type and G/G^{o} has order prime to p.

== Roots ==
The classification of reductive algebraic groups is in terms of the associated root system, as in the theories of complex semisimple Lie algebras or compact Lie groups. Here is the way roots appear for reductive groups.

Let G be a split reductive group over a field k, and let T be a split maximal torus in G; so T is isomorphic to (G_{m})^{n} for some n, with n called the rank of G. Every representation of T (as an algebraic group) is a direct sum of 1-dimensional representations. A weight for G means an isomorphism class of 1-dimensional representations of T, or equivalently a homomorphism T → G_{m}. The weights form a group X(T) under tensor product of representations, with X(T) isomorphic to the product of n copies of the integers, Z^{n}.

The adjoint representation is the action of G by conjugation on its Lie algebra $\mathfrak g$. A root of G means a nonzero weight that occurs in the action of T ⊂ G on $\mathfrak g$. The subspace of $\mathfrak g$ corresponding to each root is 1-dimensional, and the subspace of $\mathfrak g$ fixed by T is exactly the Lie algebra $\mathfrak t$ of T. Therefore, the Lie algebra of G decomposes into $\mathfrak t$ together with 1-dimensional subspaces indexed by the set Φ of roots:

$${\mathfrak g} = {\mathfrak t}\oplus \bigoplus_{\alpha\in\Phi} {\mathfrak g}_{\alpha}.$$

For example, when G is the group GL(n), its Lie algebra $\mathfrak{gl}(n)$ is the vector space of all n × n matrices over k. Let T be the subgroup of diagonal matrices in G. Then the root-space decomposition expresses $\mathfrak{gl}(n)$ as the direct sum of the diagonal matrices and the 1-dimensional subspaces indexed by the off-diagonal positions (i, j). Writing L_{1},...,L_{n} for the standard basis for the weight lattice X(T) ≅ Z^{n}, the roots are the elements L_{i} − L_{j} for all i ≠ j from 1 to n.

The roots of a semisimple group form a root system; this is a combinatorial structure which can be completely classified. More generally, the roots of a reductive group form a root datum, a slight variation. The Weyl group of a reductive group G means the quotient group of the normalizer of a maximal torus by the torus, W = N_{G}(T)/T. The Weyl group is in fact a finite group generated by reflections. For example, for GL(n) or SL(n), the Weyl group is the symmetric group S_{n}.

There are finitely many Borel subgroups containing a given maximal torus, and they are permuted simply transitively by the Weyl group (acting by conjugation). A choice of Borel subgroup determines a set of positive roots Φ^{+} ⊂ Φ, with the property that Φ is the disjoint union of Φ^{+} and −Φ^{+}. Explicitly, the Lie algebra of B is the direct sum of the Lie algebra of T and the positive root spaces:

$${\mathfrak b}={\mathfrak t}\oplus \bigoplus_{\alpha\in\Phi^{+}} {\mathfrak g}_{\alpha}.$$

For example, if B is the Borel subgroup of upper-triangular matrices in GL(n), then this is the obvious decomposition of the subspace $\mathfrak b$ of upper-triangular matrices in $\mathfrak{gl}(n)$. The positive roots are L_{i} − L_{j} for 1 ≤ i < j ≤ n.

A simple root means a positive root that is not a sum of two other positive roots. Write Δ for the set of simple roots. The number r of simple roots is equal to the rank of the commutator subgroup of G, called the semisimple rank of G (which is simply the rank of G if G is semisimple). For example, the simple roots for GL(n) or SL(n) are L_{i} − L_{i+1} for 1 ≤ i ≤ n − 1.

Root systems are classified by the corresponding Dynkin diagram, which is a finite graph (with some edges directed or multiple). The set of vertices of the Dynkin diagram is the set of simple roots. In short, the Dynkin diagram describes the angles between the simple roots and their relative lengths, with respect to a Weyl group-invariant inner product on the weight lattice. The connected Dynkin diagrams (corresponding to simple groups) are pictured below.

For a split reductive group G over a field k, an important point is that a root α determines not just a 1-dimensional subspace of the Lie algebra of G, but also a copy of the additive group G_{a} in G with the given Lie algebra, called a root subgroup U_{α}. The root subgroup is the unique copy of the additive group in G which is normalized by T and which has the given Lie algebra. The whole group G is generated (as an algebraic group) by T and the root subgroups, while the Borel subgroup B is generated by T and the positive root subgroups. In fact, a split semisimple group G is generated by the root subgroups alone.

== Parabolic subgroups ==
For a split reductive group G over a field k, the smooth connected subgroups of G that contain a given Borel subgroup B of G are in one-to-one correspondence with the subsets of the set Δ of simple roots (or equivalently, the subsets of the set of vertices of the Dynkin diagram). Let r be the order of Δ, the semisimple rank of G. Every parabolic subgroup of G is conjugate to a subgroup containing B by some element of G(k). As a result, there are exactly 2^{r} conjugacy classes of parabolic subgroups in G over k. Explicitly, the parabolic subgroup corresponding to a given subset S of Δ is the group generated by B together with the root subgroups U_{−α} for α in S. For example, the parabolic subgroups of GL(n) that contain the Borel subgroup B above are the groups of invertible matrices with zero entries below a given set of squares along the diagonal, such as:

$$\left \{ \begin{bmatrix}
* & * & * & *\\
* & * & * & *\\
0 & 0 & * & *\\
0 & 0 & 0 & *
\end{bmatrix} \right \}$$

By definition, a parabolic subgroup P of a reductive group G over a field k is a smooth k-subgroup such that the quotient variety G/P is proper over k, or equivalently projective over k. Thus the classification of parabolic subgroups amounts to a classification of the projective homogeneous varieties for G (with smooth stabilizer group; that is no restriction for k of characteristic zero). For GL(n), these are the flag varieties, parametrizing sequences of linear subspaces of given dimensions a_{1},...,a_{i} contained in a fixed vector space V of dimension n:

$$0\subset S_{a_1}\subset \cdots \subset S_{a_i}\subset V.$$

For the orthogonal group or the symplectic group, the projective homogeneous varieties have a similar description as varieties of isotropic flags with respect to a given quadratic form or symplectic form. For any reductive group G with a Borel subgroup B, G/B is called the flag variety or flag manifold of G.

== Classification of split reductive groups ==
The connected Dynkin diagrams

Chevalley showed in 1958 that the reductive groups over any algebraically closed field are classified up to isomorphism by root data. In particular, the semisimple groups over an algebraically closed field are classified up to central isogenies by their Dynkin diagram, and the simple groups correspond to the connected diagrams. Thus there are simple groups of types A_{n}, B_{n}, C_{n}, D_{n}, E_{6}, E_{7}, E_{8}, F_{4}, G_{2}. This result is essentially identical to the classifications of compact Lie groups or complex semisimple Lie algebras, by Wilhelm Killing and Élie Cartan in the 1880s and 1890s. In particular, the dimensions, centers, and other properties of the simple algebraic groups can be read from the list of simple Lie groups. It is remarkable that the classification of reductive groups is independent of the characteristic. For comparison, there are many more simple Lie algebras in positive characteristic than in characteristic zero.

The exceptional groups G of type G_{2} and E_{6} had been constructed earlier, at least in the form of the abstract group G(k), by L. E. Dickson. For example, the group G_{2} is the automorphism group of an octonion algebra over k. By contrast, the Chevalley groups of type F_{4}, E_{7}, E_{8} over a field of positive characteristic were completely new.

More generally, the classification of split reductive groups is the same over any field. A semisimple group G over a field k is called simply connected if every central isogeny from a semisimple group to G is an isomorphism. (For G semisimple over the complex numbers, being simply connected in this sense is equivalent to G(C) being simply connected in the classical topology.) Chevalley's classification gives that, over any field k, there is a unique simply connected split semisimple group G with a given Dynkin diagram, with simple groups corresponding to the connected diagrams. At the other extreme, a semisimple group is of adjoint type if its center is trivial. The split semisimple groups over k with given Dynkin diagram are exactly the groups G/A, where G is the simply connected group and A is a k-subgroup scheme of the center of G.

For example, the simply connected split simple groups over a field k corresponding to the "classical" Dynkin diagrams are as follows:

- A_{n}: SL(n+1) over k;
- B_{n}: the spin group Spin(2n+1) associated to a quadratic form of dimension 2n+1 over k with Witt index n, for example the form

$$q(x_1,\ldots,x_{2n+1})=x_1x_2+x_3x_4+\cdots+x_{2n-1}x_{2n}+x_{2n+1}^2;$$

- C_{n}: the symplectic group Sp(2n) over k;
- D_{n}: the spin group Spin(2n) associated to a quadratic form of dimension 2n over k with Witt index n, which can be written as:

$$q(x_1,\ldots,x_{2n})=x_1x_2+x_3x_4+\cdots+x_{2n-1}x_{2n}.$$

The outer automorphism group of a split reductive group G over a field k is isomorphic to the automorphism group of the root datum of G. Moreover, the automorphism group of G splits as a semidirect product:

$$\operatorname{Aut}(G)\cong \operatorname{Out}(G)\ltimes (G/Z)(k),$$

where Z is the center of G. For a split semisimple simply connected group G over a field, the outer automorphism group of G has a simpler description: it is the automorphism group of the Dynkin diagram of G.

== Reductive group schemes ==
A group scheme G over a scheme S is called reductive if the morphism G → S is smooth and affine, and every geometric fiber $G_\bar{k}$ is reductive. (For a point p in S, the corresponding geometric fiber means the base change of G to an algebraic closure $\bar{k}$ of the residue field of p.) Extending Chevalley's work, Michel Demazure and Grothendieck showed that pinned reductive group schemes over any nonempty scheme S are classified by root data. This statement includes the existence of Chevalley groups as group schemes over Z, and it says that every pinned reductive group over a scheme S is isomorphic to the base change of a Chevalley group from Z to S. A pinning of a split reductive group is a choice of root basis and also a choice of trivialisation of the one-dimensional additive group corresponding to each simple root. This statement is false without the pinning; for example, suppose that A is a Dedekind domain and that I is an ideal in A whose class in the class group of A is not a square. Then SL(A + I) and SL_{2}(A) are split and reductive over Spec A and have the same root data but they are not isomorphic: the flag scheme (the quotient by a Borel subgroup scheme) of the first is the projective line bundle P(A + I) and has no section with trivial normal bundle (a section corresponds to a short exact sequence 0 → J → A + I → K → 0 where J, K are ideal classes and the normal bundle is then J^{-1}K, which is not trivial since JK is isomorphic to I) while the flag scheme of the second is P^{1}(A) and does possess sections with trivial normal bundle.

== Real reductive groups ==
In the context of Lie groups rather than algebraic groups, a real reductive group is a Lie group G such that there is a linear algebraic group L over R whose identity component (in the Zariski topology) is reductive, and a homomorphism G → L(R) whose kernel is finite and whose image is open in L(R) (in the classical topology). It is also standard to assume that the image of the adjoint representation Ad(G) is contained in Int(g_{C}) = Ad(L^{0}(C)) (which is automatic for G connected).

In particular, every connected semisimple Lie group (meaning that its Lie algebra is semisimple) is reductive. Also, the Lie group R is reductive in this sense, since it can be viewed as the identity component of GL(1,R) ≅ R^{×}. The problem of classifying the real reductive groups largely reduces to classifying the simple Lie groups. These are classified by their Satake diagram; or one can just refer to the list of simple Lie groups (up to finite coverings).

Useful theories of admissible representations and unitary representations have been developed for real reductive groups in this generality. The main differences between this definition and the definition of a reductive algebraic group have to do with the fact that an algebraic group G over R may be connected as an algebraic group while the Lie group G(R) is not connected, and likewise for simply connected groups.

For example, the projective linear group PGL(2) is connected as an algebraic group over any field, but its group of real points PGL(2,R) has two connected components. The identity component of PGL(2,R) (sometimes called PSL(2,R)) is a real reductive group that cannot be viewed as an algebraic group. Similarly, SL(2) is simply connected as an algebraic group over any field, but the Lie group SL(2,R) has fundamental group isomorphic to the integers Z, and so SL(2,R) has nontrivial covering spaces. By definition, all finite coverings of SL(2,R) (such as the metaplectic group) are real reductive groups. On the other hand, the universal cover of SL(2,R) is not a real reductive group, even though its Lie algebra is reductive, that is, the product of a semisimple Lie algebra and an abelian Lie algebra.

For a connected real reductive group G, the quotient manifold G/K of G by a maximal compact subgroup K is a symmetric space of non-compact type. In fact, every symmetric space of non-compact type arises this way. These are central examples in Riemannian geometry of manifolds with nonpositive sectional curvature. For example, SL(2,R)/SO(2) is the hyperbolic plane, and SL(2,C)/SU(2) is hyperbolic 3-space.

For a reductive group G over a field k that is complete with respect to a discrete valuation (such as the p-adic numbers Q_{p}), the affine building X of G plays the role of the symmetric space. Namely, X is a simplicial complex with an action of G(k), and G(k) preserves a CAT(0) metric on X, the analog of a metric with nonpositive curvature. The dimension of the affine building is the k-rank of G. For example, the building of SL(2,Q_{p}) is a tree.

== Representations of reductive groups ==
For a split reductive group G over a field k, the irreducible representations of G (as an algebraic group) are parametrized by the dominant weights, which are defined as the intersection of the weight lattice X(T) ≅ Z^{n} with a convex cone (a Weyl chamber) in R^{n}. In particular, this parametrization is independent of the characteristic of k. In more detail, fix a split maximal torus and a Borel subgroup, T ⊂ B ⊂ G. Then B is the semidirect product of T with a smooth connected unipotent subgroup U. Define a highest weight vector in a representation V of G over k to be a nonzero vector v such that B maps the line spanned by v into itself. Then B acts on that line through its quotient group T, by some element λ of the weight lattice X(T). Chevalley showed that every irreducible representation of G has a unique highest weight vector up to scalars; the corresponding "highest weight" λ is dominant; and every dominant weight λ is the highest weight of a unique irreducible representation L(λ) of G, up to isomorphism.

There remains the problem of describing the irreducible representation with given highest weight. For k of characteristic zero, there are essentially complete answers. For a dominant weight λ, define the Schur module ∇(λ) as the k-vector space of sections of the G-equivariant line bundle on the flag manifold G/B associated to λ; this is a representation of G. For k of characteristic zero, the Borel–Weil theorem says that the irreducible representation L(λ) is isomorphic to the Schur module ∇(λ). Furthermore, the Weyl character formula gives the character (and in particular the dimension) of this representation.

For a split reductive group G over a field k of positive characteristic, the situation is far more subtle, because representations of G are typically not direct sums of irreducibles. For a dominant weight λ, the irreducible representation L(λ) is the unique simple submodule (the socle) of the Schur module ∇(λ), but it need not be equal to the Schur module. The dimension and character of the Schur module are given by the Weyl character formula (as in characteristic zero), by George Kempf. The dimensions and characters of the irreducible representations L(λ) are in general unknown, although a large body of theory has been developed to analyze these representations. One important result is that the dimension and character of L(λ) are known when the characteristic p of k is much bigger than the Coxeter number of G, by Henning Andersen, Jens Jantzen, and Wolfgang Soergel (proving Lusztig's conjecture in that case). Their character formula for p large is based on the Kazhdan–Lusztig polynomials, which are combinatorially complex. For any prime p, Simon Riche and Geordie Williamson conjectured the irreducible characters of a reductive group in terms of the p-Kazhdan-Lusztig polynomials, which are even more complex, but at least are computable.

== Non-split reductive groups ==
As discussed above, the classification of split reductive groups is the same over any field. By contrast, the classification of arbitrary reductive groups can be hard, depending on the base field. Some examples among the classical groups are:

- Every nondegenerate quadratic form q over a field k determines a reductive group G = SO(q). Here G is simple if q has dimension n at least 3, since $G_\bar{k}$ is isomorphic to SO(n) over an algebraic closure $\bar{k}$. The k-rank of G is equal to the Witt index of q (the maximum dimension of an isotropic subspace over k). So the simple group G is split over k if and only if q has the maximum possible Witt index, $\lfloor n/2\rfloor$.
- Every central simple algebra A over k determines a reductive group G = SL(1,A), the kernel of the reduced norm on the group of units A* (as an algebraic group over k). The degree of A means the square root of the dimension of A as a k-vector space. Here G is simple if A has degree n at least 2, since $G_{\bar k}$ is isomorphic to SL(n) over $\bar k$. If A has index r (meaning that A is isomorphic to the matrix algebra M_{n/r}(D) for a division algebra D of degree r over k), then the k-rank of G is (n/r) − 1. So the simple group G is split over k if and only if A is a matrix algebra over k.

As a result, the problem of classifying reductive groups over k essentially includes the problem of classifying all quadratic forms over k or all central simple algebras over k. These problems are easy for k algebraically closed, and they are understood for some other fields such as number fields, but for arbitrary fields there are many open questions.

A reductive group over a field k is called isotropic if it has k-rank greater than 0 (that is, if it contains a nontrivial split torus), and otherwise anisotropic. For a semisimple group G over a field k, the following conditions are equivalent:

- G is isotropic (that is, G contains a copy of the multiplicative group G_{m} over k);
- G contains a parabolic subgroup over k not equal to G;
- G contains a copy of the additive group G_{a} over k.

For k perfect, it is also equivalent to say that G(k) contains a unipotent element other than 1.

For a connected linear algebraic group G over a local field k of characteristic zero (such as the real numbers), the group G(k) is compact in the classical topology (based on the topology of k) if and only if G is reductive and anisotropic. Example: the orthogonal group SO(p,q) over R has real rank min(p,q), and so it is anisotropic if and only if p or q is zero.

A reductive group G over a field k is called quasi-split if it contains a Borel subgroup over k. A split reductive group is quasi-split. If G is quasi-split over k, then any two Borel subgroups of G are conjugate by some element of G(k). Example: the orthogonal group SO(p,q) over R is split if and only if |p−q| ≤ 1, and it is quasi-split if and only if |p−q| ≤ 2.

== Structure of semisimple groups as abstract groups ==
For a simply connected split semisimple group G over a field k, Robert Steinberg gave an explicit presentation of the abstract group G(k). It is generated by copies of the additive group of k indexed by the roots of G (the root subgroups), with relations determined by the Dynkin diagram of G.

For a simply connected split semisimple group G over a perfect field k, Steinberg also determined the automorphism group of the abstract group G(k). Every automorphism is the product of an inner automorphism, a diagonal automorphism (meaning conjugation by a suitable $\bar k$-point of a maximal torus), a graph automorphism (corresponding to an automorphism of the Dynkin diagram), and a field automorphism (coming from an automorphism of the field k).

For a k-simple algebraic group G, Tits's simplicity theorem says that the abstract group G(k) is close to being simple, under mild assumptions. Namely, suppose that G is isotropic over k, and suppose that the field k has at least 4 elements. Let G(k)^{+} be the subgroup of the abstract group G(k) generated by k-points of copies of the additive group G_{a} over k contained in G. (By the assumption that G is isotropic over k, the group G(k)^{+} is nontrivial, and even Zariski dense in G if k is infinite.) Then the quotient group of G(k)^{+} by its center is simple (as an abstract group). The proof uses Jacques Tits's machinery of BN-pairs.

The exceptions for fields of order 2 or 3 are well understood. For k = F_{2}, Tits's simplicity theorem remains valid except when G is split of type A_{1}, B_{2}, or G_{2}, or non-split (that is, unitary) of type A_{2}. For k = F_{3}, the theorem holds except for G of type A_{1}.

For a k-simple group G, in order to understand the whole group G(k), one can consider the Whitehead group W(k,G)=G(k)/G(k)^{+}. For G simply connected and quasi-split, the Whitehead group is trivial, and so the whole group G(k) is simple modulo its center. More generally, the Kneser–Tits problem asks for which isotropic k-simple groups the Whitehead group is trivial. In all known examples, W(k,G) is abelian.

For an anisotropic k-simple group G, the abstract group G(k) can be far from simple. For example, let D be a division algebra with center a p-adic field k. Suppose that the dimension of D over k is finite and greater than 1. Then G = SL(1,D) is an anisotropic k-simple group. As mentioned above, G(k) is compact in the classical topology. Since it is also totally disconnected, G(k) is a profinite group (but not finite). As a result, G(k) contains infinitely many normal subgroups of finite index.

== Lattices and arithmetic groups ==
Let G be a linear algebraic group over the rational numbers Q. Then G can be extended to an affine group scheme G over Z, and this determines an abstract group G(Z). An arithmetic group means any subgroup of G(Q) that is commensurable with G(Z). (Arithmeticity of a subgroup of G(Q) is independent of the choice of Z-structure.) For example, SL(n,Z) is an arithmetic subgroup of SL(n,Q).

For a Lie group G, a lattice in G means a discrete subgroup Γ of G such that the manifold G/Γ has finite volume (with respect to a G-invariant measure). For example, a discrete subgroup Γ is a lattice if G/Γ is compact. The Margulis arithmeticity theorem says, in particular: for a simple Lie group G of real rank at least 2, every lattice in G is an arithmetic group.

== The Galois action on the Dynkin diagram ==
In seeking to classify reductive groups which need not be split, one step is the Tits index, which reduces the problem to the case of anisotropic groups. This reduction generalizes several fundamental theorems in algebra. For example, Witt's decomposition theorem says that a nondegenerate quadratic form over a field is determined up to isomorphism by its Witt index together with its anisotropic kernel. Likewise, the Artin–Wedderburn theorem reduces the classification of central simple algebras over a field to the case of division algebras. Generalizing these results, Tits showed that a reductive group over a field k is determined up to isomorphism by its Tits index together with its anisotropic kernel, an associated anisotropic semisimple k-group.

For a reductive group G over a field k, the absolute Galois group Gal(k^{sep}/k) acts (continuously) on the "absolute" Dynkin diagram of G, that is, the Dynkin diagram of G over a separable closure k^{sep} (which is also the Dynkin diagram of G over an algebraic closure ${\bar k}$). The Tits index of G consists of the root datum of G_{k^{sep}}, the Galois action on its Dynkin diagram, and a Galois-invariant subset of the vertices of the Dynkin diagram. Traditionally, the Tits index is drawn by circling the Galois orbits in the given subset.

There is a full classification of quasi-split groups in these terms. Namely, for each action of the absolute Galois group of a field k on a Dynkin diagram, there is a unique simply connected semisimple quasi-split group H over k with the given action. (For a quasi-split group, every Galois orbit in the Dynkin diagram is circled.) Moreover, any other simply connected semisimple group G over k with the given action is an inner form of the quasi-split group H, meaning that G is the group associated to an element of the Galois cohomology set H^{1}(k,H/Z), where Z is the center of H. In other words, G is the twist of H associated to some H/Z-torsor over k, as discussed in the next section.

Example: Let q be a nondegenerate quadratic form of even dimension 2n over a field k of characteristic not 2, with n ≥ 5. (These restrictions can be avoided.) Let G be the simple group SO(q) over k. The absolute Dynkin diagram of G is of type D_{n}, and so its automorphism group is of order 2, switching the two "legs" of the D_{n} diagram. The action of the absolute Galois group of k on the Dynkin diagram is trivial if and only if the signed discriminant d of q in k*/(k*)^{2} is trivial. If d is nontrivial, then it is encoded in the Galois action on the Dynkin diagram: the index-2 subgroup of the Galois group that acts as the identity is $\operatorname{Gal}(k_s/k(\sqrt{d}))\subset \operatorname{Gal}(k_s/k)$. The group G is split if and only if q has Witt index n, the maximum possible, and G is quasi-split if and only if q has Witt index at least n − 1.

== Torsors and the Hasse principle ==
A torsor for an affine group scheme G over a field k means an affine scheme X over k with an action of G such that $X_{\overline k}$ is isomorphic to $G_{\overline k}$ with the action of $G_{\overline k}$ on itself by left translation. A torsor can also be viewed as a principal G-bundle over k with respect to the fppf topology on k, or the étale topology if G is smooth over k. The pointed set of isomorphism classes of G-torsors over k is called H^{1}(k,G), in the language of Galois cohomology.

Torsors arise whenever one seeks to classify forms of a given algebraic object Y over a field k, meaning objects X over k which become isomorphic to Y over the algebraic closure of k. Namely, such forms (up to isomorphism) are in one-to-one correspondence with the set H^{1}(k, Aut(Y)). For example, (nondegenerate) quadratic forms of dimension n over k are classified by H^{1}(k, O(n)), and central simple algebras of degree n over k are classified by H^{1}(k, PGL(n)). Also, k-forms of a given algebraic group G (sometimes called "twists" of G) are classified by H^{1}(k, Aut(G)). These problems motivate the systematic study of G-torsors, especially for reductive groups G.

When possible, one hopes to classify G-torsors using cohomological invariants, which are invariants taking values in Galois cohomology with abelian coefficient groups M, H^{a}(k,M). In this direction, Steinberg proved Serre's "Conjecture I": for a connected linear algebraic group G over a perfect field of cohomological dimension at most 1, H^{1}(k,G) = 1. (The case of a finite field was known earlier, as Lang's theorem.) It follows, for example, that every reductive group over a finite field is quasi-split.

Serre's Conjecture II predicts that for a simply connected semisimple group G over a field of cohomological dimension at most 2, H^{1}(k,G) = 1. The conjecture is known for a totally imaginary number field (which has cohomological dimension 2). More generally, for any number field k, Martin Kneser, Günter Harder and Vladimir Chernousov (1989) proved the Hasse principle: for a simply connected semisimple group G over k, the map

$$H^1(k,G)\to \prod_{v} H^1(k_v,G)$$

is bijective. Here v runs over all places of k, and k_{v} is the corresponding local field (possibly R or C). Moreover, the pointed set H^{1}(k_{v},G) is trivial for every nonarchimidean local field k_{v}, and so only the real places of k matter. The analogous result for a global field k of positive characteristic was proved earlier by Harder (1975): for every simply connected semisimple group G over k, H^{1}(k,G) is trivial (since k has no real places).

In the slightly different case of an adjoint group G over a number field k, the Hasse principle holds in a weaker form: the natural map

$$H^1(k,G)\to \prod_{v} H^1(k_v,G)$$

is injective. For G = PGL(n), this amounts to the Albert–Brauer–Hasse–Noether theorem, saying that a central simple algebra over a number field is determined by its local invariants.

Building on the Hasse principle, the classification of semisimple groups over number fields is well understood. For example, there are exactly three Q-forms of the exceptional group E_{8}, corresponding to the three real forms of E_{8}.

== See also ==
- The groups of Lie type are the finite simple groups constructed from simple algebraic groups over finite fields.
- Generalized flag variety, Bruhat decomposition, Schubert variety, Schubert calculus
- Schur algebra, Deligne–Lusztig theory
- Real form (Lie theory)
- Weil's conjecture on Tamagawa numbers
- Langlands classification, Langlands dual group, Langlands program, geometric Langlands program
- Special group, essential dimension
- Geometric invariant theory, Luna's slice theorem, Haboush's theorem
- Radical of an algebraic group
