= Iwahori subgroup =

Special group in linear algebra

In algebra, an Iwahori subgroup is a subgroup of a reductive algebraic group over a nonarchimedean local field that is analogous to a Borel subgroup of an algebraic group. A parahoric subgroup is a proper subgroup that is a finite union of double cosets of an Iwahori subgroup, so is analogous to a parabolic subgroup of an algebraic group. Iwahori subgroups are named after Nagayoshi Iwahori, and "parahoric" is a portmanteau of "parabolic" and "Iwahori". Iwahori & Matsumoto (1965) studied Iwahori subgroups for Chevalley groups over p-adic fields, and Bruhat & Tits (1972) extended their work to more general groups.

Roughly speaking, an Iwahori subgroup of an algebraic group G(K), for a local field K with integers O and residue field k, is the inverse image in G(O) of a Borel subgroup of G(k).

A reductive group over a local field has a Tits system (B,N), where B is a parahoric group, and the Weyl group of the Tits system is an affine Coxeter group.

== Definition ==
More precisely, Iwahori and parahoric subgroups can be described using the theory of affine Tits buildings. The (reduced) building B(G) of G admits a decomposition into facets. When G is quasisimple the facets are simplices and the facet decomposition gives B(G) the structure of a simplicial complex; in general, the facets are polysimplices, that is, products of simplices. The facets of maximal dimension are called the alcoves of the building.

When G is semisimple and simply connected, the parahoric subgroups are by definition the stabilizers in G of a facet, and the Iwahori subgroups are by definition the stabilizers of an alcove. If G does not satisfy these hypotheses then similar definitions can be made, but with technical complications.

When G is semisimple but not necessarily simply connected, the stabilizer of a facet is too large and one defines a parahoric as a certain finite index subgroup of the stabilizer. The stabilizer can be endowed with a canonical structure of an O-group, and the finite index subgroup, that is, the parahoric, is by definition the O-points of the algebraic connected component of this O-group. It is important here to work with the algebraic connected component instead of the topological connected component because a nonarchimedean local field is totally disconnected.

When G is an arbitrary reductive group, one uses the previous construction but instead takes the stabilizer in the subgroup of G consisting of elements whose image under any character of G is integral.

== Examples ==
- The maximal parahoric subgroups of GL_{n}(K) are the stabilizers of O-lattices in K^{n}. In particular, GL_{n}(O) is a maximal parahoric. Every maximal parahoric of GL_{n}(K) is conjugate to GL_{n}(O). The Iwahori subgroups are conjugated to the subgroup I of matrices in GL_{n}(O) which reduce to an upper triangular matrix in GL_{n}(k) where k is the residue field of O; parahoric subgroups are all groups between I and GL_{n}(O), which map one-to-one to parabolic subgroups of GL_{n}(k) containing the upper triangular matrices.
- Similarly, the maximal parahoric subgroups of SL_{n}(K) are the stabilizers of O-lattices in K^{n}, and SL_{n}(O) is a maximal parahoric. Unlike for GL_{n}(K), however, SL_{n}(K) has n conjugacy classes of maximal parahorics.
- When G is commutative, it has a unique maximal compact subgroup and a unique Iwahori subgroup, which is contained in the former. These groups do not always agree. For example, let L be a finite separable extension of K of ramification degree e. The torus L^{×}/K^{×} is compact. However, its Iwahori subgroup is O_{L}^{×}/O_{K}^{×}, a subgroup of index e whose cokernel is generated by a uniformizer of L.
