= Slice theorem =

Slice theorem may refer to:

- the slice theorem in differential geometry
- Luna's slice theorem, an analog in algebraic geometry
