= Mirabolic group =

Subgroup of GLn(k)

In mathematics, a mirabolic subgroup of the general linear group GL_{n}(k) is a subgroup consisting of automorphisms fixing a given non-zero vector in k^{n}. Mirabolic subgroups were introduced by (Gelfand & Kajdan 1975). The image of a mirabolic subgroup in the projective general linear group is a parabolic subgroup consisting of all elements fixing a given point of projective space. The word "mirabolic" is a portmanteau of "miraculous parabolic". As an algebraic group, a mirabolic subgroup is the semidirect product of a vector space with its group of automorphisms, and such groups are called mirabolic groups. The mirabolic subgroup is used to define the Kirillov model of a representation of the general linear group.

As an example, the group of all matrices of the form
$$\begin{pmatrix} a & b \\ 0 & 1 \end{pmatrix}$$
where a is a nonzero element of the field k and b is any element of k is a mirabolic subgroup of the 2-dimensional general linear group.
