= Quasi-split group =

Linear algebraic group

In mathematics, a quasi-split group over a field is a reductive group with a Borel subgroup defined over the field. Simply connected quasi-split groups over a field correspond to actions of the absolute Galois group on a Dynkin diagram.

== Examples ==
All split groups (those with a split maximal torus) are quasi-split. These correspond to quasi-split groups where the action of the Galois group on the Dynkin diagram is trivial.

Lang (1956) showed that all simple algebraic groups over finite fields are quasi-split.

Over the real numbers, the quasi-split groups include the split groups and the complex groups, together with the orthogonal groups O_{n,n+2}, the unitary groups SU_{n,n} and SU_{n,n+1}, and the form of E_{6} with signature 2.
