= Pseudo-reductive group =

Algebraic group theory concept

In mathematics, a pseudo-reductive group over a field k (sometimes called a k-reductive group) is a smooth connected affine algebraic group defined over k whose k-unipotent radical (i.e., largest smooth connected unipotent normal k-subgroup) is trivial. Over perfect fields these are the same as (connected) reductive groups, but over non-perfect fields Jacques Tits found some examples of pseudo-reductive groups that are not reductive. A pseudo-reductive k-group need not be reductive (since the formation of the k-unipotent radical does not generally commute with non-separable scalar extension on k, such as scalar extension to an algebraic closure of k). Pseudo-reductive groups arise naturally in the study of algebraic groups over function fields of positive-dimensional varieties in positive characteristic (even over a perfect field of constants).

Springer gave an exposition of Tits' results on pseudo-reductive groups, while Conrad, Gabber and Prasad built on Tits' work to develop a general structure theory, including more advanced topics such as construction techniques, root systems and root groups and open cells, classification theorems, and applications to rational conjugacy theorems for smooth connected affine groups over arbitrary fields. The general theory (with applications) as of 2010 was summarized by Rémy, and later work by Conrad and Prasad provided further refinements.

== Examples of pseudo reductive groups that are not reductive ==
Suppose that k is a non-perfect field of characteristic 2, and a is an element of k that is not a square. Let G be the group of nonzero elements x + y√a in k[√a]. There is a morphism from G to the multiplicative group G_{m} taking x + y√a to its norm x^{2} – ay^{2}, and the kernel is the subgroup of elements of norm 1. The underlying reduced scheme of the geometric kernel is isomorphic to the additive group G_{a} and is the unipotent radical of the geometric fiber of G, but this reduced subgroup scheme of the geometric fiber is not defined over k (i.e., it does not arise from a closed subscheme of G over the ground field k) and the k-unipotent radical of G is trivial. So G is a pseudo-reductive k-group but is not a reductive k-group. A similar construction works using a primitive nontrivial purely inseparable finite extension of any imperfect field in any positive characteristic, the only difference being that the formula for the norm map is a bit more complicated than in the preceding quadratic examples.

More generally, if K is a non-trivial purely inseparable finite extension of k and G is any non-trivial connected reductive K-group defined then the Weil restriction H=R_{K/k}(G) is a smooth connected affine k-group for which there is a (surjective) homomorphism from H_{K} onto G. The kernel of this K-homomorphism descends the unipotent radical of the geometric fiber of H and is not defined over k (i.e., does not arise from a closed subgroup scheme of H), so R_{K/k}(G) is pseudo-reductive but not reductive. The previous example is the special case using the multiplicative group and the extension K=k[√a].

== Classification and exotic phenomena ==
Over fields of characteristic greater than 3, all pseudo-reductive groups can be obtained from reductive groups by the "standard construction", a generalization of the construction above. The standard construction involves an auxiliary choice of a commutative pseudo-reductive group, which turns out to be a Cartan subgroup of the output of the construction, and the main complication for a general pseudo-reductive group is that the structure of Cartan subgroups (which are always commutative and pseudo-reductive) is mysterious. The commutative pseudo-reductive groups admit no useful classification (in contrast with the connected reductive case, for which they are tori and hence are accessible via Galois lattices), but modulo this one has a useful description of the situation away from characteristics 2 and 3 in terms of reductive groups over some finite (possibly inseparable) extensions of the ground field.

Over imperfect fields of characteristics 2 and 3 there are some extra pseudo-reductive groups (called exotic) coming from the existence of exceptional isogenies between groups of types B and C in characteristic 2, between groups of type F_{4} in characteristic 2, and between groups of type G_{2} in characteristic 3, using a construction analogous to that of the Ree groups. Moreover, in characteristic 2 there are additional possibilities arising not from exceptional isogenies but rather from the fact that for simply connected type C (I.e., symplectic groups) there are roots that are divisible (by 2) in the weight lattice; this gives rise to examples whose root system (over a separable closure of the ground field) is non-reduced; such examples exist with a split maximal torus and an irreducible non-reduced root system of any positive rank over every imperfect field of characteristic 2. The classification in characteristic 3 is as complete as in larger characteristics, but in characteristic 2 the classification is most complete when [k:k^2]=2 (due to complications caused by the examples with a non-reduced root system, as well as phenomena related to certain regular degenerate quadratic forms that can only exist when [k:k^2]>2). Subsequent work of Conrad & Prasad (2016), building on additional material included in the second edition Conrad, Gabber & Prasad (2015), completes the classification in characteristic 2 up to a controlled central extension by providing an exhaustive array of additional constructions that only exist when [k:k^2]>2, ultimately resting on a notion of special orthogonal group attached to regular but degenerate and not fully defective quadratic spaces in characteristic 2.
