= N-group =

- n-group (category theory), an N-category that possesses a group-like structure.
- N-group (finite group theory), a finite group all of whose local subgroups are solvable.
