= Special group (algebraic group theory) =

In the theory of algebraic groups, a special group is a linear algebraic group G with the property that every principal G-bundle is locally trivial in the Zariski topology. Special groups include the general linear group, the special linear group, and the symplectic group. Special groups are necessarily connected. Products of special groups are special. The projective linear group is not special because there exist Azumaya algebras, which are trivial over a finite separable extension, but not over the base field.

Special groups were defined in 1958 by Jean-Pierre Serre and classified soon thereafter by Alexander Grothendieck.
