= (B, N) pair =

Concept in group theory

In mathematics, a (B, N) pair is a structure on groups of Lie type that allows one to give uniform proofs of many results, instead of giving a large number of case-by-case proofs. Roughly speaking, it shows that all such groups are similar to the general linear group over a field. They were introduced by the mathematician Jacques Tits, and are also sometimes known as Tits systems.

== Definition ==
A (B, N) pair is a pair of subgroups B and N of a group G such that the following axioms hold:

- G is generated by B and N.
- The intersection, T, of B and N is a normal subgroup of N.
- The group W = N/T is generated by a set S of elements of order 2 such that
  - If s is an element of S and w is an element of W then sBw is contained in the union of BswB and BwB.
  - No element of S normalizes B.

The set S is uniquely determined by B and N and the pair (W, S) is a Coxeter system.

=== Terminology ===
BN pairs are closely related to reductive groups and the terminology in both subjects overlaps. The size of S is called the rank. We call

- B the (standard) Borel subgroup,
- T the (standard) Cartan subgroup, and
- W the Weyl group.

A subgroup of G is called

- parabolic if it contains a conjugate of B,
- standard parabolic if, in fact, it contains B itself, and
- a Borel (or minimal parabolic) if it is a conjugate of B.

== Examples ==
Abstract examples of (B, N) pairs arise from certain group actions.

- Suppose that G is any doubly transitive permutation group on a set E with more than 2 elements. We let B be the subgroup of G fixing a point x, and we let N be the subgroup fixing or exchanging 2 points x and y. The subgroup T is then the set of elements fixing both x and y, and W has order 2 and its nontrivial element is represented by anything exchanging x and y.
- Conversely, if G has a (B, N) pair of rank 1, then the action of G on the cosets of B is doubly transitive. So (B, N) pairs of rank 1 are more or less the same as doubly transitive actions on sets with more than 2 elements.

More concrete examples of (B, N) pairs can be found in reductive groups.

- Suppose that G is the general linear group GL_{n}K over a field K. We take B to be the upper triangular matrices, T to be the diagonal matrices, and N to be the monomial matrices, i.e. matrices with exactly one non-zero element in each row and column. There are n − 1 generators, represented by the matrices obtained by swapping two adjacent rows of a diagonal matrix. The Weyl group is the symmetric group on n letters.
- More generally, if G is a reductive group over a field K then the group G = G(K) has a (B, N) pair in which
  - B = P(K), where P is a minimal parabolic subgroup of G, and
  - N = N(K), where N is the normalizer of a split maximal torus contained in P.
- In particular, any finite group of Lie type has the structure of a (B, N) pair.
  - Over the field of two elements, the Cartan subgroup is trivial in this example.
- A semisimple simply-connected algebraic group over a local field has a (B, N) pair where B is an Iwahori subgroup.

== Properties ==
=== Bruhat decomposition ===
The Bruhat decomposition states that G = BWB. More precisely, the double cosets B\G/B are represented by a set of lifts of W to N.

=== Parabolic subgroups ===
Every parabolic subgroup equals its normalizer in G.

Every standard parabolic is of the form BW(X)B for some subset X of S, where W(X) denotes the Coxeter subgroup generated by X. Moreover, two standard parabolics are conjugate if and only if their sets X are the same. Hence there is a bijection between subsets of S and standard parabolics. More generally, this bijection extends to conjugacy classes of parabolic subgroups.

=== Tits's simplicity theorem ===
BN-pairs can be used to prove that many groups of Lie type are simple modulo their centers. More precisely, if G has a BN-pair such that B is a solvable group, the intersection of all conjugates of B is trivial, and the set of generators of W cannot be decomposed into two non-empty commuting sets, then G is simple whenever it is a perfect group. In practice all of these conditions except for G being perfect are easy to check. Checking that G is perfect needs some slightly messy calculations (and in fact there are a few small groups of Lie type which are not perfect). But showing that a group is perfect is usually far easier than showing it is simple.
