= Slice theorem (differential geometry) =

On extending a Lie group action on a manifold to an equivariant diffeomorphism

In differential geometry, the slice theorem states: given a manifold $M$ on which a Lie group $G$ acts as diffeomorphisms, for any $x$ in $M$, the map $G/G_x \to M, \, [g] \mapsto g \cdot x$ extends to an invariant neighborhood of $G/G_x$ (viewed as a zero section) in $G \times_{G_x} T_x M / T_x(G \cdot x)$ so that it defines an equivariant diffeomorphism from the neighborhood to its image, which contains the orbit of $x$.

The important application of the theorem is a proof of the fact that the quotient $M/G$ admits a manifold structure when $G$ is compact and the action is free.

In algebraic geometry, there is an analog of the slice theorem; it is called Luna's slice theorem.

== Idea of proof when G is compact ==
Since $G$ is compact, there exists an invariant metric; i.e., $G$ acts as isometries. One then adapts the usual proof of the existence of a tubular neighborhood using this metric.

== See also ==
- Luna's slice theorem, an analogous result for reductive algebraic group actions on algebraic varieties
