= N-group (finite group theory) =

In mathematical finite group theory, an N-group is a group all of whose local subgroups (that is, the normalizers of nontrivial p-subgroups) are solvable groups. The non-solvable ones were classified by Thompson during his work on finding all the minimal finite simple groups.

== Simple N-groups ==
The simple N-groups were classified by Thompson (1968, 1970, 1971, 1973, 1974, 1974b) in a series of 6 papers totaling about 400 pages.

The simple N-groups consist of the special linear groups PSL_{2}(q), PSL_{3}(3), the Suzuki groups Sz(2^{2n+1}), the unitary group U_{3}(3), the alternating group A_{7}, the Mathieu group M_{11}, and the Tits group. (The Tits group was overlooked in Thomson's original announcement in 1968, but Hearn pointed out that it was also a simple N-group.) More generally Thompson showed that any non-solvable N-group is a subgroup of Aut(G) containing G for some simple N-group G.

Gorenstein & Lyons (1976) generalized Thompson's theorem to the case of groups where all 2-local subgroups are solvable. The only extra simple groups that appear are the unitary groups U_{3}(q).

== Proof ==
Gorenstein (1980, 16.5) gives a summary of Thompson's classification of N-groups.

The primes dividing the order of the group are divided into four classes π_{1}, π_{2}, π_{3}, π_{4} as follows

- π_{1} is the set of primes p such that a Sylow p-subgroup is nontrivial and cyclic.
- π_{2} is the set of primes p such that a Sylow p-subgroup P is non-cyclic but SCN_{3}(P) is empty.
- π_{3} is the set of primes p such that a Sylow p-subgroup P has SCN_{3}(P) nonempty and normalizes a nontrivial abelian subgroup of order prime to p.
- π_{4} is the set of primes p such that a Sylow p-subgroup P has SCN_{3}(P) nonempty but does not normalize a nontrivial abelian subgroup of order prime to p.

The proof is subdivided into several cases depending on which of these four classes the prime 2 belongs to, and also on an integer e, which is the largest integer for which there is an elementary abelian subgroup of rank e normalized by a nontrivial 2-subgroup intersecting it trivially.

- Thompson (1968) Gives a general introduction, stating the main theorem and proving many preliminary lemmas.
- Thompson (1970) characterizes the groups E_{2}(3) and S_{4}(3) (in Thompson's notation; these are the exceptional group G_{2}(3) and the symplectic group Sp_{4}(3)) which are not N-groups but whose characterizations are needed in the proof of the main theorem.
- Thompson (1971) covers the case where 2∉π_{4}. Theorem 11.2 shows that if 2∈π_{2} then the group is PSL_{2}(q), M_{11}, A_{7}, U_{3}(3), or PSL_{3}(3). The possibility that 2∈π_{3} is ruled out by showing that any such group must be a C-group and using Suzuki's classification of C-groups to check that none of the groups found by Suzuki satisfy this condition.
- Thompson (1973) and Thompson (1974) cover the cases when 2∈π_{4} and e≥3, or e=2. He shows that either G is a C-group so a Suzuki group, or satisfies his characterization of the groups E_{2}(3) and S_{4}(3) in his second paper, which are not N-groups.
- Thompson (1974) covers the case when 2∈π_{4} and e=1, where the only possibilities are that G is a C-group or the Tits group.

== Consequences ==
A minimal simple group is a non-cyclic simple group all of whose proper subgroups are solvable. The complete list of minimal finite simple groups is given as follows Thompson (1968, corollary 1)

- PSL_{2}(2^{p}), p a prime.
- PSL_{2}(3^{p}), p an odd prime.
- PSL_{2}(p), p > 3 a prime congruent to 2 or 3 mod 5
- Sz(2^{p}), p an odd prime.
- PSL_{3}(3)

In other words a non-cyclic finite simple group must have a subquotient isomorphic to one of these groups.
