= Distribution on a linear algebraic group =

Linear function satisfying a support condition

In algebraic geometry, given a linear algebraic group G over a field k, a distribution on it is a linear functional $k[G] \to k$ satisfying some support condition. A convolution of distributions is again a distribution and thus they form the Hopf algebra on G, denoted by Dist(G), which contains the Lie algebra Lie(G) associated to G. Over a field of characteristic zero, Cartier's theorem says that Dist(G) is isomorphic to the universal enveloping algebra of the Lie algebra of G and thus the construction gives no new information. In the positive characteristic case, the algebra can be used as a substitute for the Lie group–Lie algebra correspondence and its variant for algebraic groups in the characteristic zero; for example, this approach taken in (Jantzen 1987).

== Construction ==
=== The Lie algebra of a linear algebraic group ===
Let k be an algebraically closed field and G a linear algebraic group (that is, affine algebraic group) over k. By definition, Lie(G) is the Lie algebra of all derivations of k[G] that commute with the left action of G. As in the Lie group case, it can be identified with the tangent space to G at the identity element.

=== Enveloping algebra ===
There is the following general construction for a Hopf algebra. Let A be a Hopf algebra. The finite dual of A is the space of linear functionals on A with kernels containing left ideals of finite codimensions. Concretely, it can be viewed as the space of matrix coefficients.

== Distributions on an algebraic group ==
=== Definition ===
Let X = Spec A be an affine scheme over a field k and let I_{x} be the kernel of the restriction map $A \to k(x)$, the residue field of x. By definition, a distribution f supported at x'' is a k-linear functional on A such that $f(I_x^n) = 0$ for some n. (Note: the definition is still valid if k is an arbitrary ring.)

Now, if G is an algebraic group over k, we let Dist(G) be the set of all distributions on G supported at the identity element (often just called distributions on G). If f, g are in it, we define the product of f and g, demoted by f * g, to be the linear functional

$$k[G] \overset{\Delta}\to k[G] \otimes k[G] \overset{f \otimes g}\to k \otimes k = k$$

where Δ is the comultiplication that is the homomorphism induced by the multiplication $G \times G \to G$. The multiplication turns out to be associative (use $1 \otimes \Delta \circ \Delta = \Delta \otimes 1 \circ \Delta$) and thus Dist(G) is an associative algebra, as the set is closed under the muplication by the formula:

(*) $\Delta(I_1^n) \subset \sum_{r=0}^n I_1^r \otimes I^{n-r}_1.$

It is also unital with the unity that is the linear functional $k[G] \to k, \phi \mapsto \phi(1)$, the Dirac's delta measure.

The Lie algebra Lie(G) sits inside Dist(G). Indeed, by definition, Lie(G) is the tangent space to G at the identity element 1; i.e., the dual space of $I_1/I_1^2$. Thus, a tangent vector amounts to a linear functional on I_{1} that has no constant term and kills the square of I_{1} and the formula (*) implies $[f, g] = f * g - g * f$ is still a tangent vector.

Let $\mathfrak{g} = \operatorname{Lie}(G)$ be the Lie algebra of G. Then, by the universal property, the inclusion $\mathfrak{g} \hookrightarrow \operatorname{Dist}(G)$ induces the algebra homomorphism:

$$U(\mathfrak{g}) \to \operatorname{Dist}(G).$$

When the base field k has characteristic zero, this homomorphism is an isomorphism.

=== Examples ===
==== Additive group ====
Let $G = \mathbb{G}_a$ be the additive group; i.e., G(R) = R for any k-algebra R. As a variety G is the affine line; i.e., the coordinate ring is k[t] and I^{n}_{0} = (t^{n}).

==== Multiplicative group ====
Let $G = \mathbb{G}_m$ be the multiplicative group; i.e., G(R) = R^{*} for any k-algebra R. The coordinate ring of G is k[t, t^{−1}] (since G is really GL_{1}(k).)

=== Correspondence ===
- For any closed subgroups H, 'K of G, if k is perfect and H is irreducible, then

$$H \subset K \Leftrightarrow \operatorname{Dist}(H) \subset \operatorname{Dist}(K).$$

- If V is a G-module (that is a representation of G), then it admits a natural structure of Dist(G)-module, which in turns gives the module structure over $\mathfrak{g}$.
- Any action G on an affine algebraic variety X induces the representation of G on the coordinate ring k[X]. In particular, the conjugation action of G induces the action of G on k[G]. One can show I^{n}_{1} is stable under G and thus G acts on (k[G]/I^{n}_{1})^{*} and whence on its union Dist(G). The resulting action is called the adjoint action of G.

== The case of finite algebraic groups ==
Let G be an algebraic group that is "finite" as a group scheme; for example, any finite group may be viewed as a finite algebraic group. There is an equivalence of categories between the category of finite algebraic groups and the category of finite-dimensional cocommutative Hopf algebras given by mapping G to k[G]^{*}, the dual of the coordinate ring of G. Note that Dist(G) is a (Hopf) subalgebra of k[G]^{*}.
