= Kirillov model =

In mathematics, the Kirillov model, studied by Kirillov (1963), is a realization of a representation of GL_{2} over a local field on a space of functions on the local field.

If G is the algebraic group GL_{2} and F is a non-Archimedean local field, and τ is a fixed nontrivial character of the additive group of F and π is an irreducible representation of G(F), then the Kirillov model for π is a representation π on a space of locally constant functions f on F^{*} with compact support in F such that

$$\pi\left(\begin{pmatrix}a & b \\ 0 & 1\end{pmatrix}\right)f(x) = \tau(bx)f(ax).$$

Jacquet & Langlands (1970) showed that an irreducible representation of dimension greater than 1 has an essentially unique Kirillov model. Over a local field, the space of functions with compact support in F^{*} has codimension 0, 1, or 2 in the Kirillov model, depending on whether the irreducible representation is cuspidal, special, or principal.

The Whittaker model can be constructed from the Kirillov model, by defining the image W_{ξ} of a vector ξ of the Kirillov model by

W_{ξ}(g) = π(g)ξ(1)

where π(g) is the image of g in the Kirillov model.

Bernstein (1984) defined the Kirillov model for the general linear group GL_{n} using the mirabolic subgroup. More precisely, a Kirillov model for a representation of the general linear group is an embedding of it in the representation of the mirabolic group induced from a non-degenerate character of the group of upper triangular matrices.
