= Luna's slice theorem =

Mathematical theorem

In mathematics, Luna's slice theorem, introduced by Luna (1973), describes the local behavior of an action of a reductive algebraic group on an affine variety. It is an analogue in algebraic geometry of the theorem that a compact Lie group acting on a smooth manifold X has a slice at each point x, in other words a subvariety W such that X looks locally like G×_{G_{x}} W. (see slice theorem (differential geometry).)
