= Henning Haahr Andersen =

Danish mathematician

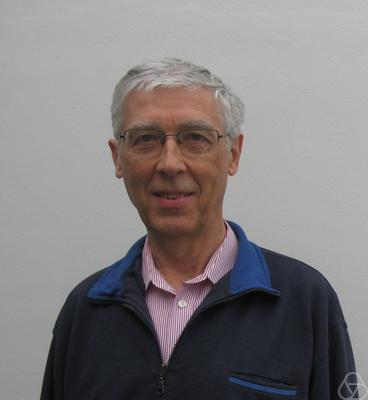
Andersen in 2012

Henning Haahr Andersen is a mathematician specializing in Algebraic groups, Lie algebras, Quantum groups and Representation theory.

Andersen received his Ph.D. from the Massachusetts Institute of Technology in 1977 under the supervision of Steven Lawrence Kleiman.

In 2012, Andersen became a fellow of the American Mathematical Society.
