= Kneser–Tits conjecture =

In mathematics, the Kneser–Tits problem, introduced by Tits (1964) based on a suggestion by Martin Kneser, asks whether the Whitehead group W(G,K) of a semisimple simply connected isotropic algebraic group G over a field K is trivial. ["Généralisant le problème de Tannaka-Artin, M.Kneser a posé la question suivante que j’ai imprudemment transformé en conjecture." - J. Tits 1978.] The Whitehead group is the quotient of the rational points of G by the normal subgroup generated by K-subgroups isomorphic to the additive group.

== Fields for which the Whitehead group vanishes ==
A special case of the Kneser–Tits problem asks for which fields the Whitehead group of a semisimple almost simple simply connected isotropic algebraic group is always trivial. Platonov (1969) showed that this Whitehead group is trivial for local fields K, and gave examples of fields for which it is not always trivial. For global fields the combined work of several authors shows that this Whitehead group is always trivial (Gille 2009).
