= C-group =

Class of mathematical groups

In mathematical group theory, a C-group is a group such that the centralizer of any involution has a normal Sylow 2-subgroup. They include as special cases CIT-groups where the centralizer of any involution is a 2-group, and TI-groups where any Sylow 2-subgroups have trivial intersection.

The simple C-groups were determined by Suzuki (1965), and his classification is summarized by Gorenstein (1980, 16.4). The classification of C-groups was used in Thompson's classification of N-groups. The finite non-abelian simple C-groups are

- the projective special linear groups PSL_{2}(p) for p a Fermat or Mersenne prime, and p≥5
- the projective special linear groups PSL_{2}(9)
- the projective special linear groups PSL_{2}(2^{n}) for n≥2
- the projective special linear groups PSL_{3}(2^{n}) for n≥1
- the projective special unitary groups PSU_{3}(2^{n}) for n≥2
- the Suzuki groups Sz(2^{2n+1}) for n≥1

== CIT-groups ==
The C-groups include as special cases the CIT-groups, that are groups in which the centralizer of any involution is a 2-group. These were classified by Suzuki (1961, 1962), and the finite non-abelian simple ones consist of the finite non-abelian simple C-groups other than PSL_{3}(2^{n}) and PSU_{3}(2^{n}) for n≥2. The ones whose Sylow 2-subgroups are elementary abelian were classified in a paper of Burnside (1899), which was forgotten for many years until rediscovered by Feit in 1970.

== TI-groups ==
The C-groups include as special cases the TI-groups (trivial intersection groups), that are groups in which any two Sylow 2-subgroups have trivial intersection. These were classified by Suzuki (1964), and the simple ones are of the form PSL_{2}(q), PSU_{3}(q), Sz(q) for q a power of 2.
