= Martin Kneser =

German mathematician (1928–2004)

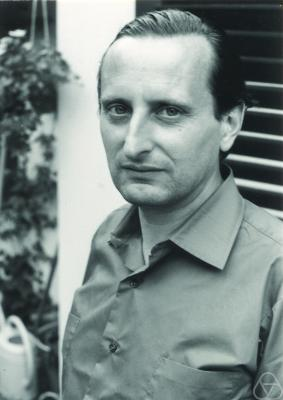
- Martin Kneser, 1973
- Born: 21 January 1928
- Died: 16 February 2004 (aged 76)
- Education: Humboldt University of Berlin
- Scientific career
- Fields: Mathematics
- Workplaces: University of Göttingen; LMU Munich
- Doctoral advisor: Erhard Schmidt
- Doctoral students: Hans-Volker Niemeier; Albrecht Pfister; Ulrich Stuhler

Martin Kneser (21 January 1928 – 16 February 2004) was a German mathematician. His father Hellmuth Kneser and grandfather Adolf Kneser were also mathematicians.

He obtained his PhD in 1950 from the Humboldt University of Berlin with the dissertation "Über den Rand von Parallelkörpern". His advisor was Erhard Schmidt.

His name has been given to Kneser graphs which he studied in 1955. He also gave a simplified proof of the Fundamental theorem of algebra.

Kneser was an invited speaker at the ICM 1962 in Stockholm. His main publications were on quadratic forms and algebraic groups.

== See also ==
- Approximation in algebraic groups
- Betke–Kneser theorem
- Kneser–Tits conjecture
- Kneser's theorem (combinatorics)
- Kneser graphs
