= Jacques Tits =

Belgian mathematician (1930–2021)

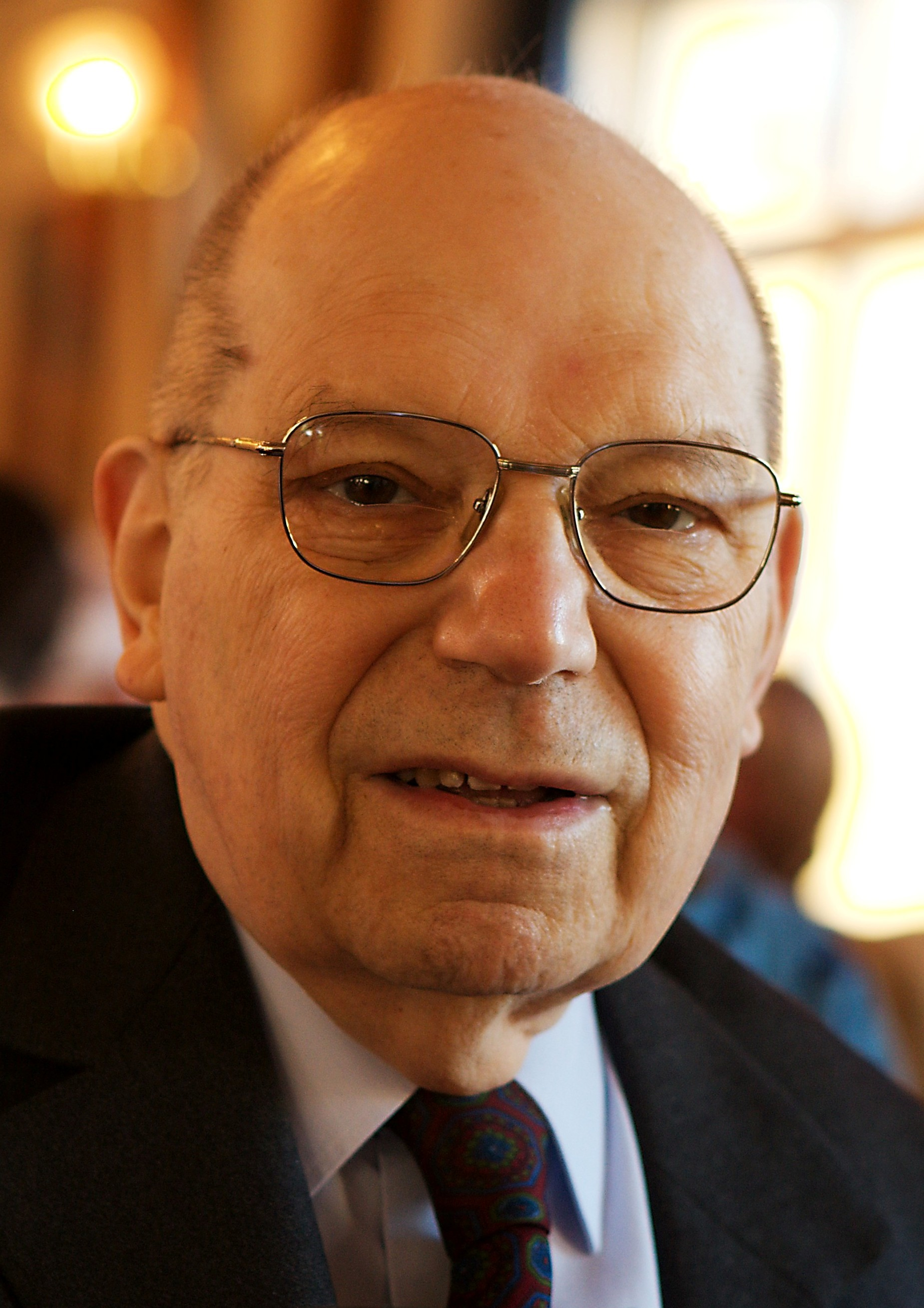
- Tits in 2008
- Born: 12 August 1930; Uccle, Belgium
- Died: 5 December 2021 (aged 91); 13th arrondissement, Paris, France
- Citizenship: Belgian (1930–1974); French (from 1974)
- Education: Free University of Brussels
- Known for: Tits alternative Tits building Tits cone Tits group Tits index Tits metric Tits systems Bruhat–Tits fixed point theorem Freudenthal–Tits magic square Kantor–Koecher–Tits construction Artin-Tits group Kneser–Tits conjecture Field with one element Generalized polygon
- Awards: Francois Deruyts Prize (1962); Wolf Prize (1993); Pour le Mérite (1995); Cantor medal (1996); Abel Prize (2008)
- Scientific career
- Fields: Mathematics
- Workplaces: Free University of Brussels; Vrije Universiteit Brussel; University of Bonn; Collège de France; French Academy of Sciences
- Thesis: Généralisation des groupes projectifs basés sur la notion de transitivité (1950)
- Doctoral advisor: Paul Libois
- Doctoral students: Francis Buekenhout; Jens Carsten Jantzen; Karl-Otto Stöhr

Jacques Tits (French: [ʒak tits]; 12 August 1930 – 5 December 2021) was a Belgian-born French mathematician who worked on group theory and incidence geometry. He introduced Tits buildings, the Tits alternative, the Tits group, and the Tits metric.

== Early life and education ==
Tits was born in Uccle, Belgium to Léon Tits, a professor, and Louisa André. Jacques attended the Athénée of Uccle and the Free University of Brussels. His thesis advisor was Paul Libois, and Tits graduated with his doctorate in 1950 with the dissertation Généralisation des groupes projectifs basés sur la notion de transitivité.

== Career ==
Tits held professorships at the Free University of Brussels (now split into the Université libre de Bruxelles and the Vrije Universiteit Brussel) (1962–1964), the University of Bonn (1964–1974) and the Collège de France in Paris, until becoming emeritus in 2000. He changed his citizenship to French in 1974 in order to teach at the Collège de France, which at that point required French citizenship. Because Belgian nationality law did not allow dual nationality at the time, he renounced his Belgian citizenship.

Tits was an "honorary" member of the Nicolas Bourbaki group; as such, he helped popularize H.S.M. Coxeter's work, introducing terms such as Coxeter number, Coxeter group, and Coxeter graph.

== Death ==
Tits died on 5 December 2021, at the age of 91 in the 13th arrondissement, Paris.

== Awards and honors ==
Tits received the Wolf Prize in Mathematics in 1993, the Cantor Medal from the Deutsche Mathematiker-Vereinigung (German Mathematical Society) in 1996, and the German distinction "Pour le Mérite". In 2008 he was awarded the Abel Prize, along with John Griggs Thompson, "for their profound achievements in algebra and in particular for shaping modern group theory".

Tits became a member of the French Academy of Sciences in 1979. He was a member of the Norwegian Academy of Science and Letters. He became a foreign member of the Royal Netherlands Academy of Arts and Sciences in 1988.

== Contributions ==
He introduced the theory of buildings (sometimes known as Tits buildings), which are combinatorial structures on which groups act, particularly in algebraic group theory (including finite groups, and groups defined over the p-adic numbers). The related theory of (B, N) pairs is a basic tool in the theory of groups of Lie type. Of particular importance is his classification of all irreducible buildings of spherical type and rank at least three, which involved classifying all polar spaces of rank at least three. The existence of these buildings initially depended on the existence of a group of Lie type in each case, but in joint work with Mark Ronan he constructed those of rank at least four independently, yielding the groups directly. In the rank-2 case spherical building are generalized n-gons, and in joint work with Richard Weiss he classified these when they admit a suitable group of symmetries (the so-called Moufang polygons). In collaboration with François Bruhat he developed the theory of affine buildings, and later he classified all irreducible buildings of affine type and rank at least four.

Another of his well-known theorems is the "Tits alternative": if G is a finitely generated subgroup of a linear group, then either G has a solvable subgroup of finite index or it has a free subgroup of rank 2.

The Tits group and the Kantor–Koecher–Tits construction are named after him. He introduced the Kneser–Tits conjecture.

== Publications ==
- Tits, Jacques (1964). "Algebraic and abstract simple groups". Annals of Mathematics. Second Series. 80 (2): 313–329. doi:10.2307/1970394. ISSN 0003-486X. JSTOR 1970394. MR 0164968.
- Tits, Jacques (1974). Buildings of spherical type and finite BN-pairs. Lecture Notes in Mathematics, Vol. 386. Vol. 386. Berlin, New York: Springer-Verlag. doi:10.1007/978-3-540-38349-9. ISBN 978-3-540-06757-3. MR 0470099.
- Tits, Jacques; Weiss, Richard M. (2002). Moufang polygons. Springer Monographs in Mathematics. Berlin, New York: Springer-Verlag. ISBN 978-3-540-43714-7. MR 1938841.
- J. Tits, Oeuvres - Collected Works, 4 vol., Europ. Math. Soc., 2013. J. Tits, Résumés des cours au Collège de France, S.M.F., Doc.Math. 12, 2013.
