= Borel subgroup =

Type of subgroup of an algebraic group

In the theory of algebraic groups, a Borel subgroup of an algebraic group G is a maximal Zariski closed and connected solvable algebraic subgroup. For example, in the general linear group GL_{n} (n x n invertible matrices), the subgroup of invertible upper triangular matrices is a Borel subgroup.

For groups realized over algebraically closed fields, there is a single conjugacy class of Borel subgroups.

Borel subgroups are one of the two key ingredients in understanding the structure of simple (more generally, reductive) algebraic groups, in Jacques Tits' theory of groups with a (B, N) pair. Here the group B is a Borel subgroup and N is the normalizer of a maximal torus contained in B.

The notion was introduced by Armand Borel, who played a leading role in the development of the theory of algebraic groups.

== Parabolic subgroups ==
Subgroups between a Borel subgroup B and the ambient group G are called parabolic subgroups. Parabolic subgroups P are also characterized, among algebraic subgroups, by the condition that G/P is a complete variety. Working over algebraically closed fields, the Borel subgroups turn out to be the minimal parabolic subgroups in this sense. Thus B is a Borel subgroup when the homogeneous space G/B is a complete variety which is "as large as possible".

For a simple algebraic group G, the set of conjugacy classes of parabolic subgroups is in bijection with the set of all subsets of nodes of the corresponding Dynkin diagram; the Borel subgroup corresponds to the empty set and G itself corresponding to the set of all nodes. (In general, each node of the Dynkin diagram determines a simple negative root and thus a one-dimensional 'root group' of G. A subset of the nodes thus yields a parabolic subgroup, generated by B and the corresponding negative root groups. Moreover, any parabolic subgroup is conjugate to such a parabolic subgroup.) The corresponding subgroups of the Weyl group of G are also called parabolic subgroups, see Parabolic subgroup of a reflection group.

== Example ==
Let $G = GL_4(\mathbb{C})$. A Borel subgroup $B$ of $G$ is the set of upper triangular matrices

$$\left\{
A = \begin{bmatrix}
a_{11} & a_{12} & a_{13} & a_{14} \\
0 & a_{22} & a_{23} & a_{24} \\
0 & 0 &  a_{33} & a_{34} \\
0 & 0 & 0 & a_{44}
\end{bmatrix} : \det(A) \neq 0 \right\}$$

and the maximal proper parabolic subgroups of $G$ containing $B$ are

$$\left\{
\begin{bmatrix}
a_{11} & a_{12} & a_{13} & a_{14} \\
0 & a_{22} & a_{23} & a_{24} \\
0 & a_{32} &  a_{33} & a_{34} \\
0 & a_{42} & a_{43} & a_{44}
\end{bmatrix}\right\}, \text{ } \left\{
\begin{bmatrix}
a_{11} & a_{12} & a_{13} & a_{14} \\
a_{21} & a_{22} & a_{23} & a_{24} \\
0 & 0 &  a_{33} & a_{34} \\
0 & 0 & a_{43} & a_{44}
\end{bmatrix}\right\}, \text{ } \left\{
\begin{bmatrix}
a_{11} & a_{12} & a_{13} & a_{14} \\
a_{21} & a_{22} & a_{23} & a_{24} \\
a_{31} & a_{32} &  a_{33} & a_{34} \\
0 & 0 & 0 & a_{44}
\end{bmatrix}\right\}$$

Also, a maximal torus in $B$ is

$$\left\{
\begin{bmatrix}
a_{11} & 0 & 0 & 0 \\
0 & a_{22} & 0 & 0 \\
0 & 0 &  a_{33} & 0 \\
0 & 0 & 0 & a_{44}
\end{bmatrix}: a_{11}\cdot a_{22} \cdot a_{33}\cdot a_{44} \neq 0\right\}$$

This is isomorphic to the algebraic torus $(\mathbb{C}^*)^4 = \text{Spec}(\mathbb{C}[x^{\pm 1},y^{\pm 1},z^{\pm 1},w^{\pm 1}])$.

== Lie algebra ==
For the special case of a Lie algebra $\mathfrak{g}$ with a Cartan subalgebra $\mathfrak{h}$, given an ordering of $\mathfrak{h}$, the Borel subalgebra is the direct sum of $\mathfrak{h}$ and the weight spaces of $\mathfrak{g}$ with positive weight. A Lie subalgebra of $\mathfrak{g}$ containing a Borel subalgebra is called a parabolic Lie algebra.

== See also ==
- Hyperbolic group
- Cartan subgroup
- Mirabolic subgroup
