= Cartan subgroup =

Maximal connected Abelian subgroup

In the theory of algebraic groups, a Cartan subgroup of a connected linear algebraic group $G$ over a (not necessarily algebraically closed) field $k$ is the centralizer of a maximal torus. Cartan subgroups are smooth (equivalently reduced), connected and nilpotent. If $k$ is algebraically closed, they are all conjugate to each other.

Notice that in the context of algebraic groups a torus is an algebraic group $T$ such that the base extension $T_{(\bar{k})}$ (where $\bar{k}$ is the algebraic closure of $k$) is isomorphic to the product of a finite number of copies of the $\mathbf{G}_m=\mathbf{GL}_1$. Maximal such subgroups have in the theory of algebraic groups a role that is similar to that of maximal tori in the theory of Lie groups.

If $G$ is reductive (in particular, if it is semi-simple), then a torus is maximal if and only if it is its own centraliser and thus Cartan subgroups of $G$ are precisely the maximal tori.

== Example ==
The general linear groups $\mathbf{GL}_n$ are reductive. The diagonal subgroup is clearly a torus (indeed a split torus, since it is product of n copies of $\mathbf{G}_m$ already before any base extension), and it can be shown to be maximal. Since $\mathbf{GL}_n$ is reductive, the diagonal subgroup is a Cartan subgroup.

== See also ==
- Borel subgroup
- Algebraic group
- Algebraic torus
