= General linear group =

Group of 𝑛 × 𝑛 invertible matrices

In mathematics, the general linear group of degree $n$ is the set of $n\times n$ invertible matrices, together with the operation of ordinary matrix multiplication. This forms a group, because the product of two invertible matrices is again invertible, and the inverse of an invertible matrix is invertible, with the identity matrix as the identity element of the group. The group is so named because the columns (and also the rows) of an invertible matrix are linearly independent, hence the vectors/points they define are in general linear position, and matrices in the general linear group take points in general linear position to points in general linear position.

To be more precise, it is necessary to specify what kind of objects may appear in the entries of the matrix. For example, the general linear group over $\R$ (the set of real numbers) is the group of $n\times n$ invertible matrices of real numbers, and is denoted by $\operatorname{GL}_n(\R)$ or $\operatorname{GL}(n,\R)$.

More generally, the general linear group of degree $n$ over any field $F$ (such as the complex numbers), or a ring $R$ (such as the ring of integers), is the set of $n\times n$ invertible matrices with entries from $F$ (or $R$), again with matrix multiplication as the group operation. Typical notation is $\operatorname{GL}(n,F)$ or $\operatorname{GL}_n(F)$, or simply $\operatorname{GL}(n)$ if the field is understood.

More generally still, the general linear group of a vector space $\operatorname{GL}(V)$ is the automorphism group, not necessarily written as matrices.

The special linear group, written $\operatorname{SL}(n,F)$ or $\operatorname{SL}_n(F)$, is the subgroup of $\operatorname{GL}(n,F)$ consisting of matrices with a determinant of 1.

The group $\operatorname{GL}(n,F)$ and its subgroups are often called linear groups or matrix groups (the automorphism group $\operatorname{GL}(V)$ is a linear group but not a matrix group). These groups are important in the theory of group representations, and also arise in the study of spatial symmetries and symmetries of vector spaces in general, as well as the study of polynomials. The modular group may be realised as a quotient of the special linear group $\operatorname{SL}(2,\Z)$.

If $n\geq 2$, then the group $\operatorname{GL}(n,F)$ is not abelian.

== General linear group of a vector space ==
If $V$ is a vector space over the field $F$, the general linear group of $V$, written $\operatorname{GL}(V)$ or $\operatorname{Aut}(V)$, is the group of all automorphisms of $V$, i.e. the set of all bijective linear transformations $V\to V$, together with functional composition as group operation. If $V$ has finite dimension $n$, then $\operatorname{GL}(V)$ and $\operatorname{GL}(n,F)$ are isomorphic. The isomorphism is not canonical; it depends on a choice of basis in $V$. Given a basis $\{e_1,\dots,e_n\}$ of $V$ and an automorphism $T$ in $\operatorname{GL}(V)$, we have then for every basis vector e_{i} that

$$T(e_i) = \sum_{j=1}^n a_{ji} e_j$$

for some constants $a_{ij}$ in $F$; the matrix corresponding to $T$ is then just the matrix with entries given by the $a_{ji}$.

In a similar way, for a commutative ring $R$ the group $\operatorname{GL}(n,R)$ may be interpreted as the group of automorphisms of a free $R$-module $M$ of rank $n$. One can also define GL(M) for any $R$-module, but in general this is not isomorphic to $\operatorname{GL}(n,R)$ (for any $n$).

== In terms of determinants ==
Over a field $F$, a matrix is invertible if and only if its determinant is nonzero. Therefore, an alternative definition of $\operatorname{GL}(n,F)$ is as the group of matrices with nonzero determinant.

Over a commutative ring $R$, more care is needed: a matrix over $R$ is invertible if and only if its determinant is a unit in $R$, that is, if its determinant is invertible in $R$. Therefore, $\operatorname{GL}(n,R)$ may be defined as the group of matrices whose determinants are units.

Over a non-commutative ring $R$, determinants are not at all well behaved. In this case, $\operatorname{GL}(n,R)$ may be defined as the unit group of the matrix ring $M(n,R)$.

== As a Lie group/algebra ==
=== Real case ===
The general linear group $\operatorname{GL}(n,\R)$ over the field of real numbers is a real Lie group of dimension $n^2$. To see this, note that the set of all $n\times n$ real matrices, $M_n(\R)$, forms a real vector space of dimension $n^2$. The subset $\operatorname{GL}(n,\R)$ consists of those matrices whose determinant is non-zero. The determinant is a polynomial map, and hence $\operatorname{GL}(n,\R)$ is an open affine subvariety of $M_n(\R)$ (a non-empty open subset of $M_n(\R)$ in the Zariski topology), and therefore a smooth manifold of the same dimension.

The Lie algebra of $\operatorname{GL}(n,\R)$, denoted $\mathfrak{gl}_n,$ consists of all $n\times n$ real matrices with the commutator serving as the Lie bracket.

As a manifold, $\operatorname{GL}(n,\R)$ is not connected but rather has two connected components: the matrices with positive determinant and the ones with negative determinant. The identity component, denoted by $\operatorname{GL}^+(n,\R)$, consists of the real $n\times n$ matrices with positive determinant. This is also a Lie group of dimension $n^2$; it has the same Lie algebra as $\operatorname{GL}(n,\R)$.

The polar decomposition, which is unique for invertible matrices, shows that there is a homeomorphism between $\operatorname{GL}(n,\R)$ and the Cartesian product of $\operatorname{O}(n)$ with the set of positive-definite symmetric matrices. Similarly, it shows that there is a homeomorphism between $\operatorname{GL}^+(n,\R)$ and the Cartesian product of $\operatorname{SO}(n)$ with the set of positive-definite symmetric matrices. Because the latter is contractible, the fundamental group of $\operatorname{GL}^+(n,\R)$ is isomorphic to that of $\operatorname{SO}(n)$.

The homeomorphism also shows that the group $\operatorname{GL}(n,\R)$ is noncompact. “The” maximal compact subgroup of $\operatorname{GL}(n,\R)$ is the orthogonal group $\operatorname{O}(n)$, while "the" maximal compact subgroup of $\operatorname{GL}^+(n,\R)$ is the special orthogonal group $\operatorname{SO}(n)$. As for $\operatorname{SO}(n)$, the group $\operatorname{GL}^+(n,\R)$ is not simply connected (except when $n=1$, but rather has a fundamental group isomorphic to $\Z$ for $n=2$ or $\Z_2$ for $n>2$.

=== Complex case ===
The general linear group over the field of complex numbers, $\operatorname{GL}(n,\C)$, is a complex Lie group of complex dimension $n^2$. As a real Lie group (through realification) it has dimension $2n^2$. The set of all real matrices forms a real Lie subgroup. These correspond to the inclusions

$$\operatorname{GL}(n,\R)<\operatorname{GL}(n,\C)<\operatorname{GL}(2n,\R)$$,

which have real dimensions $n^2$, $2n^2$, and $(2n)^2=4n^2$. Complex $n$-dimensional matrices can be characterized as real $2n$-dimensional matrices that preserve a linear complex structure; that is, matrices that commute with a matrix $J$ such that $J^2=-I$, where $J$ corresponds to multiplying by the imaginary unit $i$.

The Lie algebra corresponding to $\operatorname{GL}(n,\C)$ consists of all $n\times n$ complex matrices with the commutator serving as the Lie bracket.

Unlike the real case, $\operatorname{GL}(n,\C)$ is connected. This follows, in part, since the multiplicative group of complex numbers $\C^\times$ is connected. The group manifold $\operatorname{GL}(n,\C)$ is not compact; rather its maximal compact subgroup is the unitary group $\operatorname{U}(n)$. As for $\operatorname{U}(n)$, the group manifold $\operatorname{GL}(n,\C)$ is not simply connected but has a fundamental group isomorphic to $\Z$.

== Over finite fields ==
Cayley table of GL(2, 2), which is isomorphic to S_{3}.

If $F$ is a finite field with $q$ elements, then we sometimes write $\operatorname{GL}(n,q)$ instead of $\operatorname{GL}(n,F)$. When p is prime, $\operatorname{GL}(n,p)$ is the outer automorphism group of the group $\Z_p^n$, and also the automorphism group, because $\Z_p^n$ is abelian, so the inner automorphism group is trivial.

The order of $\operatorname{GL}(n,q)$ is:

$$\prod_{k=0}^{n-1}(q^n-q^k)=(q^n - 1)(q^n - q)(q^n - q^2)\ \cdots\ (q^n - q^{n-1}).$$

This can be shown by counting the possible columns of the matrix: the first column can be anything but the zero vector; the second column can be anything but the multiples of the first column; and in general, the $k$th column can be any vector not in the linear span of the first $k-1$ columns. In q-analog notation, this is $[n]_q!(q-1)^n q^{n \choose 2}$.

For example, GL(3, 2) has order (8 − 1)(8 − 2)(8 − 4) = 168. It is the automorphism group of the Fano plane and of the group $\Z_2^3$. This group is also isomorphic to PSL(2, 7).

More generally, one can count points of Grassmannian over $F$: in other words the number of subspaces of a given dimension $k$. This requires only finding the order of the stabilizer subgroup of one such subspace and dividing into the formula just given, by the orbit-stabilizer theorem.

These formulas are connected to the Schubert decomposition of the Grassmannian, and are q-analogs of the Betti numbers of complex Grassmannians. This was one of the clues leading to the Weil conjectures.

Note that in the limit $q\to 1$ the order of $\operatorname{GL}(n,q)$ goes to 0! – but under the correct procedure (dividing by $(q-1)^n$) we see that it is the order of the symmetric group (see Lorscheid's article). In the philosophy of the field with one element, one thus interprets the symmetric group as the general linear group over the field with one element: $S_n\cong \operatorname{GL}(n,1)$.

=== History ===
The general linear group over a prime field, $\operatorname{GL}(\nu,p)$, was constructed and its order computed by Évariste Galois in 1832, in his last letter (to Chevalier) and second (of three) attached manuscripts, which he used in the context of studying the Galois group of the general equation of order $p^\nu$.

== Special linear group ==
The special linear group, $\operatorname{SL}(n,F)$, is the group of all matrices with determinant 1. These matrices are special in that they lie on a subvariety: they satisfy a polynomial equation (as the determinant is a polynomial in the entries). Matrices of this type form a group as the determinant of the product of two matrices is the product of the determinants of each matrix.

If we write $F^\times$ for the multiplicative group of $F$ (that is, $F$ excluding 0), then the determinant is a group homomorphism

$$\det : \operatorname{GL}(n,F) \to F^\times$$

that is surjective and its kernel is the special linear group. Thus, $\operatorname{SL}(n,F)$ is a normal subgroup of $\operatorname{GL}(n,F)$, and by the first isomorphism theorem, $\operatorname{GL}(n,F)/\operatorname{SL}(n,F)$ is isomorphic to $F^\times$. In fact, $\operatorname{GL}(n,F)$ can be written as a semidirect product:

$$\operatorname{GL}(n,F)=\operatorname{SL}(n,F)\rtimes F^\times$$.

The special linear group is also the derived group (also known as commutator subgroup) of $\operatorname{GL}(n,F)$ (for a field or a division ring $F$), provided that $n \neq 2$ or $F$ is not the field with two elements.

When $F$ is $\R$ or $\C$, $\operatorname{SL}(n,F)$ is a Lie subgroup of $\operatorname{GL}(n,F)$ of dimension $n^2-1$. The Lie algebra of $\operatorname{SL}(n,F)$ consists of all $n\times n$ matrices over $F$ with vanishing trace. The Lie bracket is given by the commutator.

The special linear group $\operatorname{SL}(n,\R)$ can be characterized as the group of volume and orientation-preserving linear transformations of $\R^n$.

The group $\operatorname{SL}(n,\C)$ is simply connected, while $\operatorname{SL}(n,\R)$ is not. $\operatorname{SL}(n,\R)$ has the same fundamental group as $\operatorname{GL}^+(n,\R)$, that is, $\Z$ for $n=2$ and $\Z_2$ for $n>2$.

== Other subgroups ==
=== Diagonal subgroups ===
The set of all invertible diagonal matrices forms a subgroup of $\operatorname{GL}(n,F)$ isomorphic to $(F^\times)^n$. In fields like $\R$ and $\C$, these correspond to rescaling the space; the so-called dilations and contractions.

A scalar matrix is a diagonal matrix which is a constant times the identity matrix. The set of all nonzero scalar matrices forms a subgroup of $\operatorname{GL}(n,F)$ isomorphic to $F^\times$. This group is the center of $\operatorname{GL}(n,F)$. In particular, it is a normal, abelian subgroup.

The center of $\operatorname{SL}(n,F)$ is simply the set of all scalar matrices with unit determinant, and is isomorphic to the group of $n$th roots of unity in the field $F$.

=== Classical groups ===
The so-called classical groups are subgroups of $\operatorname{GL}(V)$ which preserve some sort of bilinear form on a vector space $V$. These include the

- orthogonal group, $\operatorname{O}(V)$, which preserves a non-degenerate quadratic form on $V$,
- symplectic group, $\operatorname{Sp}(V)$, which preserves a symplectic form on $V$ (a non-degenerate alternating form),
- unitary group, $\operatorname{U}(V)$, which, when $F=\C$, preserves a non-degenerate hermitian form on $V$.

These groups provide important examples of Lie groups.

== Related groups and monoids ==
=== Projective linear group ===
The projective linear group $\operatorname{PGL}(n,F)$ and the projective special linear group $\operatorname{PSL}(n,F)$ are the quotients of $\operatorname{GL}(n,F)$ and $\operatorname{SL}(n,F)$ by their centers (which consist of the multiples of the identity matrix therein); they are the induced action on the associated projective space.

=== Affine group ===
The affine group $\operatorname{Aff}(n,F)$ is an extension of $\operatorname{GL}(n,F)$ by the group of translations in $F^n$. It can be written as a semidirect product:

$$\operatorname{Aff}(n,F)=\operatorname{GL}(n,F)\ltimes F^n$$

where $\operatorname{GL}(n,F)$ acts on $F^n$ in the natural manner. The affine group can be viewed as the group of all affine transformations of the affine space underlying the vector space $F^n$.

One has analogous constructions for other subgroups of the general linear group: for instance, the special affine group is the subgroup defined by the semidirect product, $\operatorname{SL}(n,F)\ltimes F^n$, and the Poincaré group is the affine group associated to the Lorentz group, $\operatorname{O}(1,3,F)\ltimes F^n$.

=== General semilinear group ===
The general semilinear group $\operatorname{\Gamma L}(n,F)$ is the group of all invertible semilinear transformations, and contains $\operatorname{GL}(n,F)$. A semilinear transformation is a transformation which is linear “up to a twist”, meaning “up to a field automorphism under scalar multiplication”. It can be written as a semidirect product:

$$\operatorname{\Gamma L}(n,F)=\operatorname{Gal}(F)\ltimes \operatorname{GL}(n,F)$$

where $\operatorname{Gal}(F)$ is the Galois group of $F$ (over its prime field), which acts on $\operatorname{GL}(n,F)$ by the Galois action on the entries.

The main interest of $\operatorname{\Gamma L}(n,F)$ is that the associated projective semilinear group $\operatorname{P\Gamma L}(n,F)$, which contains $\operatorname{PGL}(n,F)$, is the collineation group of projective space, for $n>2$, and thus semilinear maps are of interest in projective geometry.

=== Full linear monoid ===
If one removes the restriction of the determinant being non-zero, the resulting algebraic structure is a monoid, usually called the full linear monoid, but occasionally also full linear semigroup, general linear monoid etc. It is actually a regular semigroup. The group of units of the full linear monoid $M_n(F)$ is the general linear group $\operatorname{GL}(n,F)$. Its idempotents are matrices $E$ satisfying $E^2=E$. An idempotent of rank $r$ is similar to a block diagonal matrix $\operatorname{diag}(I_r,0)$, and its associated maximal subgroup is isomorphic to $\operatorname{GL}(r,F)$.

== Infinite general linear group ==
The infinite general linear group or stable general linear group is the direct limit of the inclusions $\operatorname{GL}(n,F)\to \operatorname{GL}(n+1,F)$ as block diagonal matrices with an added $1$ entry in the lower right. It is denoted by either $\operatorname{GL}(F)$ or $\operatorname{GL}(\infty,F)$, and can also be interpreted as invertible infinite matrices which differ from the identity matrix in only finitely many places.

It is used in algebraic K-theory to define K_{1}, and over the reals has a well-understood topology, thanks to Bott periodicity.

It should not be confused with the space of (bounded) invertible operators on a Hilbert space, which is a larger group, and topologically much simpler, namely contractible – see Kuiper's theorem.

== See also ==
- List of finite simple groups
- SL_{2}(R)
- Representation theory of SL_{2}(R)
- Representations of classical Lie groups
