= Special linear group =

Group of matrices with determinant 1

Cayley table of SL(2,3).

In mathematics, the special linear group $\operatorname{SL}(n,R)$ of degree $n$ over a commutative ring $R$ is the group (under matrix multiplication) of the $n\times n$ matrices with entries in $R$ and determinant $1.$ This is a normal subgroup of the general linear group, since it is the kernel of the determinant, viewed as a group homorphism from the general linear group to the multiplicative group of $R$ (that is, $R$ excluding $0$ when $R$ is a field).

These elements are "special" in that they form an algebraic subvariety of the general linear group – they satisfy a polynomial equation (since the determinant is polynomial in the entries).

When $R$ is the finite field of order $q$, the notation $\operatorname{SL}(n,q)$ is sometimes used.

== Geometric interpretation ==
The special linear group $\operatorname{SL}(n,\R)$ can be characterized as the group of volume- and orientation-preserving linear transformations of $\R^n$. This corresponds to the interpretation of the determinant as measuring change in volume and orientation.

== Lie subgroup ==
When $F$ is $\R$ or $\C$, $\operatorname{SL}(n,F)$ is a Lie subgroup of $\operatorname{GL}(n,F)$ of dimension $n^2-1$. The Lie algebra $\mathfrak{sl}(n, F)$ of $\operatorname{SL}(n,F)$ consists of all $n\times n$ matrices over $F$ with vanishing trace. The Lie bracket is given by the commutator.

== Topology ==
Any invertible matrix can be uniquely represented according to the polar decomposition as the product of a unitary matrix and a Hermitian matrix with positive eigenvalues. The determinant of the unitary matrix is on the unit circle, while that of the Hermitian matrix is real and positive. Since in the case of a matrix from the special linear group the product of these two determinants must be 1, then each of them must be 1. Therefore, a special linear matrix can be written as the product of a special unitary matrix (or special orthogonal matrix in the real case) and a positive definite Hermitian matrix (or symmetric matrix in the real case) having determinant 1.

It follows that the topology of the group $\operatorname{SL}(n,\C)$ is the product of the topology of $\operatorname{SU}(n)$ and the topology of the group of Hermitian matrices of unit determinant with positive eigenvalues. A Hermitian matrix of unit determinant and having positive eigenvalues can be uniquely expressed as the exponential of a traceless Hermitian matrix, and therefore the topology of this is that of $(n^2-1)$-dimensional Euclidean space. Since $\operatorname{SU}(n)$ is simply connected, then $\operatorname{SL}(n,\C)$ is also simply connected, for all $n\geq 2$.

The topology of $\operatorname{SL}(n,\R)$ is the product of the topology of SO(n) and the topology of the group of symmetric matrices with positive eigenvalues and unit determinant. Since the latter matrices can be uniquely expressed as the exponential of symmetric traceless matrices, then this latter topology is that of (n + 2)(n − 1)/2-dimensional Euclidean space. Thus, the group $\operatorname{SL}(n,\R)$ has the same fundamental group as $\operatorname{SO}(n)$; that is, $\Z$ for $n=2$ and $\Z_2$ for $n>2$. In particular this means that $\operatorname{SL}(n,\R)$, unlike $\operatorname{SL}(n,\C)$, is not simply connected, for $n>1$.

== Relations to other subgroups of GL(n, A) ==
Two related subgroups, which in some cases coincide with $\operatorname{SL}$, and in other cases are accidentally conflated with $\operatorname{SL}$, are the commutator subgroup of $\operatorname{GL}$, and the group generated by transvections. These are both subgroups of $\operatorname{SL}$ (transvections have determinant 1, and det is a map to an abelian group, so $[\operatorname{GL},\operatorname{GL}]<\operatorname{SL}$), but in general do not coincide with it.

The group generated by transvections is denoted $\operatorname{E}(n,A)$ (for elementary matrices) or $\operatorname{TV}(n,A)$. By the second Steinberg relation, for $n\geq 3$, transvections are commutators, so for $n\geq 3$, $\operatorname{E}(n,A)<[\operatorname{GL}(n,A),\operatorname{GL}(n,A)]$.

For $n=2$, transvections need not be commutators (of $2\times 2$ matrices), as seen for example when $A$ is $\mathbb{F}_2$, the field of two elements. In that case

$$A_3 \cong [\operatorname{GL}(2, \mathbb{F}_2),\operatorname{GL}(2, \mathbb{F}_2)] < \operatorname{E}(2, \mathbb{F}_2) = \operatorname{SL}(2, \mathbb{F}_2) = \operatorname{GL}(2, \mathbb{F}_2) \cong S_3,$$

where $A_3$ and $S_3$ respectively denote the alternating and symmetric group on 3 letters.

However, if $A$ is a field with more than 2 elements, then E(2, A) = [GL(2, A), GL(2, A)], and if $A$ is a field with more than 3 elements, E(2, A) = [SL(2, A), SL(2, A)].

In some circumstances these coincide: the special linear group over a field or a Euclidean domain is generated by transvections, and the stable special linear group over a Dedekind domain is generated by transvections. For more general rings the stable difference is measured by the special Whitehead group $SK_1(A)=\operatorname{SL}(A)/\operatorname{E}(A)$, where $\operatorname{SL}(A)$ and $\operatorname{E}(A)$ are the stable groups of the special linear group and elementary matrices.

== Generators and relations ==
If working over a ring where $\operatorname{SL}$ is generated by transvections (such as a field or Euclidean domain), one can give a presentation of $\operatorname{SL}$ using transvections with some relations. Transvections satisfy the Steinberg relations, but these are not sufficient: the resulting group is the Steinberg group, which is not the special linear group, but rather the universal central extension of the commutator subgroup of $\operatorname{GL}$.

A sufficient set of relations for $\text{SL}(n,\mathbb{Z})$ for $n\geq 3$ is given by two of the Steinberg relations, plus a third relation (Conder, Robertson & Williams 1992, p. 19). Let $T_{ij}:=e_{ij}(1)$ be the elementary matrix with $1$'s on the diagonal and in the $ij$ position, and $0$'s elsewhere (and $i\neq j$). Then

$$\begin{align}
\left[ T_{ij},T_{jk} \right] &= T_{ik}     && \text{for } i \neq k \\[4pt]
\left[ T_{ij},T_{k\ell} \right] &= \mathbf{1} && \text{for } i \neq \ell, j \neq k \\[4pt]
\left(T_{12}T_{21}^{-1}T_{12}\right)^4 &= \mathbf{1}
\end{align}$$

are a complete set of relations for $\text{SL}(n,\mathbb{Z}),n\geq 3$.

== SL^{±}(n,F) ==
In characteristic other than 2, the set of matrices with determinant ±1 form another subgroup of GL, with SL as an index 2 subgroup (necessarily normal); in characteristic 2 this is the same as SL. This forms a short exact sequence of groups:

$$1\to\operatorname{SL}(n, F) \to \operatorname{SL}^{\pm}(n, F) \to \{\pm 1\}\to1.$$

This sequence splits by taking any matrix with determinant −1, for example the diagonal matrix $(-1, 1, \dots, 1).$ If $n = 2k + 1$ is odd, the negative identity matrix $-I$ is in SL^{±}(n,F) but not in SL(n,F) and thus the group splits as an internal direct product $\operatorname{SL}^\pm(2k + 1, F) \cong \operatorname{SL}(2k + 1, F) \times \{\pm I\}$. However, if $n = 2k$ is even, $-I$ is already in SL(n,F) , SL^{±} does not split, and in general is a non-trivial group extension.

Over the real numbers, SL^{±}(n, R) has two connected components, corresponding to SL(n, R) and another component, which are isomorphic with identification depending on a choice of point (matrix with determinant −1). In odd dimension these are naturally identified by $-I$, but in even dimension there is no one natural identification.

== Structure of GL(n,F) ==
The group $\operatorname{GL}(n,F)$ splits over its determinant (we use $F^\times = \operatorname{GL}(1,F)\to \operatorname{GL}(n,F)$ as the monomorphism from $F^\times$ to $\operatorname{GL}(n,F)$, see semidirect product), and therefore $\operatorname{GL}(n,F)$ can be written as a semidirect product of $\operatorname{SL}(n,F)$ by $F^\times$:

$$\operatorname{GL}(n,F)=\operatorname{SL}(n,F)\rtimes F^\times$$.

== See also ==
- SL(2, R)
- SL(2, C)
- Modular group (PSL(2, Z))
- Projective linear group
- Conformal map
- Representations of classical Lie groups
