= Klingen Eisenstein series =

Siegel modular form

In mathematics, a Klingen Eisenstein series is a Siegel modular form of weight k and degree g depending on another Siegel cusp form f of weight k and degree r<g, given by a series similar to an Eisenstein series. It is a generalization of the Siegel Eisenstein series, which is the special case when the Siegel cusp form is 1. Klingen Eisenstein series is introduced by Klingen (1967).

== Definition ==
Suppose that f is a Siegel cusp form of degree r and weight k with k > g + r + 1 an even integer. The Klingen Eisenstein series is

$$\sum_{\binom{ab}{cd}\isin P_r\setminus\Gamma_g} f\left(\frac{a\tau+b}{c\tau+d}\right)\det(c\tau+d)^{-k}.$$

It is a Siegel modular form of weight k and degree g. Here P_{r} is the integral points of a certain parabolic subgroup of the symplectic group, and Γ_{g} is the group of integral points of the degree g symplectic group. The variable τ is in the Siegel upper half plane of degree g. The function f is originally defined only for elements of the Siegel upper half plane of degree r, but extended to the Siegel upper half plane of degree g by projecting this to the smaller Siegel upper half plane.

The cusp form f is the image of the Klingen Eisenstein series under the operator Φ^{g−r}, where Φ is the Siegel operator.
