= Θ10 =

In representation theory, a branch of mathematics, θ_{10} is a particular unitary representation of the symplectic group Sp_{4}, which has some exceptional properties. The symplectic group Sp_{4} is the set of 4×4 matrices that preserve a skew-symmetric non-degenerate matrix, but its unitary representations – that is, the ways of realizing that set as a group of linear operators preserving the inner product in a Hilbert space – are often subtle.

The notation θ_{10} was first used for a complex irreducible representation of the finite group Sp_{4}(F_{q}), where F_{q} is a finite field with q elements. In this finite-field case, for q odd, θ_{10} has dimension q(q – 1)^{2}/2. It is notable because it is simultaneously cuspidal, unipotent, and degenerate, meaning that it has no Whittaker model. Related representations, also denoted θ_{10}, occur for Sp_{4} over local and global fields.

== Finite-field case ==
Srinivasan (1968) introduced θ_{10} in her determination of the irreducible characters of the finite symplectic group Sp_{4}(F_{q}) for q odd. She showed that θ_{10} has degree q(q – 1)^{2}/2.

The subscript 10 is historical. Srinivasan labelled certain characters of Sp_{4}(F_{q}) as θ_{1}, θ_{2}, ..., θ_{13}; the tenth character in this list is the cuspidal unipotent character now known as θ_{10}.

In the finite-field setting, θ_{10} is the only cuspidal unipotent representation of Sp_{4}(F_{q}). It is also the smallest example of a cuspidal unipotent representation of a reductive group and the smallest example of a degenerate cuspidal representation. General linear groups do not have cuspidal unipotent representations, and they do not have degenerate cuspidal representations. Thus θ_{10} exhibits features of the representation theory of general reductive groups that are absent for general linear groups.

== Construction ==
One construction of θ_{10} uses the Weil representation and Howe duality. Let V be a four-dimensional symplectic vector space over F_{q}, and let E be a two-dimensional anisotropic quadratic space over F_{q}. Then V ⊗ E is an eight-dimensional symplectic vector space.

The Weil representation of Sp(V ⊗ E) restricts to an action of Sp(V) × O(E). Since O(E) contains the special orthogonal group SO(E) as a subgroup of index two, the representation can be decomposed using the characters of SO(E) and the involution coming from the nontrivial coset of O(E). In this decomposition, one of the resulting irreducible Sp(V)-representations, usually denoted W^{−}_{1}, has dimension q(q – 1)^{2}/2. Its character is the representation θ_{10}.

== Properties ==
The representation θ_{10} is irreducible, so it has no nonzero proper invariant subspaces. It is cuspidal, meaning that it does not arise from a proper parabolic subgroup by parabolic induction. Equivalently, in the finite-field setting, its restriction to the unipotent radical of a proper parabolic subgroup does not contain the trivial representation.

It is also degenerate: it does not admit a Whittaker model. For representations of reductive groups, the existence of a Whittaker model is often called genericity. Thus θ_{10} is an example of a cuspidal but non-generic representation.

Finally, θ_{10} is unipotent in the sense of Deligne–Lusztig theory: it occurs in the part of the character theory attached to the trivial character of a maximal torus. The simultaneous occurrence of all three properties – cuspidal, unipotent, and degenerate – is what makes θ_{10} exceptional.

== Local and global analogues ==
Representations also denoted θ_{10} occur for Sp_{4} over local and global fields. Howe & Piatetski-Shapiro (1979) used such representations in their construction of counterexamples to the generalized Ramanujan conjecture for quasi-split groups. These examples showed that a naive generalization of the Ramanujan conjecture to all cuspidal automorphic representations of reductive groups could not hold without additional hypotheses, such as genericity.

Adams (2004) described the real local representation θ_{10} for the Lie group Sp_{4}(R). Kim & Piatetski-Shapiro (2001) studied quadratic base change for θ_{10}.
