= Alvis–Curtis duality =

In mathematics, the Alvis–Curtis duality is a duality operation on the characters of a reductive group over a finite field, introduced by Charles W. Curtis (1980) and studied by his student Dean Alvis (1979). Kawanaka (1981, 1982) introduced a similar duality operation for Lie algebras.

Alvis–Curtis duality has order 2 and is an isometry on generalized characters.

Carter (1985, 8.2) discusses Alvis–Curtis duality in detail.

== Definition ==
The dual ζ* of a character ζ of a finite group G with a split BN-pair is defined to be

$$\zeta^*=\sum_{J\subseteq R}(-1)^{\vert J\vert}\zeta^G_{P_J}$$

Here the sum is over all subsets J of the set R of simple roots of the Coxeter system of G. The character ζ_{P_{J}} is the truncation of ζ to the parabolic subgroup P_{J} of the subset J, given by restricting ζ to P_{J} and then taking the space of invariants of the unipotent radical of P_{J}, and ζ^{G}_{P_{J}} is the induced representation of G. (The operation of truncation is the adjoint functor of parabolic induction.)

== Examples ==
- The dual of the trivial character 1 is the Steinberg character.
- Deligne & Lusztig (1983) showed that the dual of a Deligne–Lusztig character R^{θ}_{T} is ε_{G}ε_{T}R^{θ}_{T}.
- The dual of a cuspidal character χ is (–1)^{|Δ|}χ, where Δ is the set of simple roots.
- The dual of the Gelfand–Graev character is the character taking value |Z^{F}|q^{l} on the regular unipotent elements and vanishing elsewhere.
