= Whittaker model =

In mathematics, representation of a reductive algebraic group

In representation theory, a branch of mathematics, the Whittaker model is a realization of a representation of a reductive algebraic group such as GL_{2} over a finite or local or global field on a space of functions on the group. It is named after E. T. Whittaker even though he never worked in this area, because (Jacquet 1966, 1967) pointed out that for the group SL_{2}(R) some of the functions involved in the representation are Whittaker functions.

Irreducible representations without a Whittaker model are sometimes called "degenerate", and those with a Whittaker model are sometimes called "generic". The representation θ_{10} of the symplectic group Sp_{4} is the simplest example of a degenerate representation.

== Whittaker models for GL_{2} ==
If G is the algebraic group GL_{2} and F is a local field, and τ is a fixed non-trivial character of the additive group of F and π is an irreducible representation of a general linear group G(F), then the Whittaker model for π is a representation π on a space of functions ƒ on G(F) satisfying

$$f\left(\begin{pmatrix}1 & b \\ 0 & 1\end{pmatrix}g\right) = \tau(b)f(g).$$

Jacquet & Langlands (1970) used Whittaker models to assign L-functions to admissible representations of GL_{2}.

== Whittaker models for GL_{n} ==
Let $G$ be the general linear group $\operatorname{GL}_n$, $\psi$ a smooth complex valued non-trivial additive character of $F$ and $U$ the subgroup of $\operatorname{GL}_n$ consisting of unipotent upper triangular matrices. A non-degenerate character on $U$ is of the form

$$\chi(u)=\psi(\alpha_1 x_{12}+\alpha_2 x_{23}+\cdots+\alpha_{n-1}x_{n-1n}),$$

for $u=(x_{ij})$ ∈ $U$ and non-zero $\alpha_1, \ldots, \alpha_{n-1}$ ∈ $F$. If $(\pi,V)$ is a smooth representation of $G(F)$, a Whittaker functional $\lambda$ is a continuous linear functional on $V$ such that $\lambda(\pi(u)v)=\chi(u)\lambda(v)$ for all $u$ ∈ $U$, $v$ ∈ $V$. Multiplicity one states that, for $\pi$ unitary irreducible, the space of Whittaker functionals has dimension at most equal to one.

== Whittaker models for reductive groups ==
If G is a split reductive group and U is the unipotent radical of a Borel subgroup B, then a Whittaker model for a representation is an embedding of it into the induced (Gelfand–Graev) representation Ind^{G}_{U}(χ), where χ is a non-degenerate character of U, such as the sum of the characters corresponding to simple roots.

== See also ==
- Gelfand–Graev representation, roughly the sum of Whittaker models over a finite field.
- Kirillov model
