= Green function =

Green function might refer to:

- Green's function of a differential operator
- Deligne–Lusztig theory (Green function) in the representation theory of finite groups of Lie type
- Green's function (many-body theory) in many-body theory
