= Siegel Eisenstein series =

In mathematics, a Siegel Eisenstein series (sometimes just called an Eisenstein series or a Siegel series) is a generalization of Eisenstein series to Siegel modular forms.

Katsurada (1999) gave an explicit formula for their coefficients.

== Definition ==
The Siegel Eisenstein series of degree g and weight an even integer k > 2 is given by the sum

$$\sum_{C,D}\frac{1}{\det(CZ+D)^k}$$

Sometimes the series is multiplied by a constant so that the constant term of the Fourier expansion is 1.

Here Z is an element of the Siegel upper half space of degree d, and the sum is over equivalence classes of matrices C,D that are the "bottom half" of an element of the Siegel modular group.

== See also ==
- Klingen Eisenstein series, a generalization of the Siegel Eisenstein series.
