= Werner Meyer =

Werner Meyer may refer to:

- Werner Meyer (handballer) (1914–1985), Swiss field handball player
- Werner Meyer, a mathematician who introduced the Meyer signature cocycle
