= Unipotent representation =

In mathematics, a unipotent representation of a reductive group is a representation that has some similarities with unipotent conjugacy classes of groups.

Informally, Langlands philosophy suggests that there should be a correspondence between representations of a reductive group and conjugacy classes of a Langlands dual group, and the unipotent representations should be roughly the ones corresponding to unipotent classes in the dual group.

Unipotent representations are supposed to be the basic "building blocks" out of which one can construct all other representations in the following sense. Unipotent representations should form a small (preferably finite) set of irreducible representations for each reductive group, such that all irreducible representations can be obtained from unipotent representations of possibly smaller groups by some sort of systematic process, such as (cohomological or parabolic) induction.

== Finite fields ==
Over finite fields, the unipotent representations are those that occur in the decomposition of the Deligne–Lusztig characters R^{1}_{T} of the trivial representation 1 of a torus T . They were classified by Lusztig (1978, 1979). Some examples of unipotent representations over finite fields are the trivial 1-dimensional representation, the Steinberg representation, and θ_{10}.

== Non-archimedean local fields ==
Lusztig (1995) classified the unipotent characters over non-archimedean local fields.

== Archimedean local fields ==
Vogan (1987) discusses several different possible definitions of unipotent representations of real Lie groups.

== See also ==
- Deligne–Lusztig theory
