= Half-space =

Half-space may refer to:

- Half-space (geometry), either of the two parts into which a plane divides Euclidean space
  - (Poincaré) Half-space model, a model of hyperbolic geometry using a Euclidean half-space
  - Siegel upper half-space, a set of complex matrices with positive definite imaginary part
- Half-space (punctuation), a spacing character half the width of a regular space
- Half-space model (oceanography), an estimate for seabed height in areas without significant subduction
