= Unipotent =

Algebraic term

In mathematics, a unipotent element r of a ring R is one such that r − 1 is a nilpotent element; in other words, (r − 1)^{n} is zero for some n.

In particular, a square matrix M is a unipotent matrix if and only if its characteristic polynomial P(t) is a power of t − 1. Thus all the eigenvalues of a unipotent matrix are 1.

The term quasi-unipotent means that some power is unipotent, for example for a diagonalizable matrix with eigenvalues that are all roots of unity.

In the theory of algebraic groups, a group element is unipotent if it acts unipotently in a certain natural group representation. A unipotent affine algebraic group is then a group with all elements unipotent.

== Definition ==
=== Definition with matrices ===
Consider the group $\mathbb{U}_n$ of upper-triangular matrices with $1$'s along the diagonal, so they are the group of matrices

$$\mathbb{U}_n =  \left\{
\begin{bmatrix}
1 & * & \cdots & * & * \\
0 & 1 & \cdots & * & * \\
\vdots & \vdots &  &\vdots & \vdots \\
0& 0& \cdots & 1 &* \\
0 & 0 & \cdots & 0 & 1
\end{bmatrix}
\right\}.$$

Then, a unipotent group can be defined as a subgroup of some $\mathbb{U}_n$. Using scheme theory the group $\mathbb{U}_n$ can be defined as the group scheme

$$\text{Spec}\left(
\frac{\mathbb{C}\!\left[x_{11},x_{12},\ldots, x_{nn}, \frac{1}{\text{det}}\right]}{
(x_{ii} = 1, x_{i > j} = 0)
}
\right)$$

and an affine group scheme is unipotent if it is a closed group scheme of this scheme.

=== Definition with ring theory ===
An element x of an affine algebraic group is unipotent when its associated right translation operator, r_{x}, on the affine coordinate ring A[G] of G is locally unipotent as an element of the ring of linear endomorphism of A[G]. (Locally unipotent means that its restriction to any finite-dimensional stable subspace of A[G] is unipotent in the usual ring-theoretic sense.)

An affine algebraic group is called unipotent if all its elements are unipotent. Any unipotent algebraic group is isomorphic to a closed subgroup of the group of upper triangular matrices with diagonal entries 1, and conversely any such subgroup is unipotent. In particular any unipotent group is a nilpotent group, though the converse is not true (counterexample: the diagonal matrices of GL_{n}(k)).

For example, the standard representation of $\mathbb{U}_n$ on $k^n$ with standard basis $e_i$ has the fixed vector $e_1$.

=== Definition with representation theory ===
If a unipotent group acts on an affine variety, all its orbits are closed, and if it acts linearly on a finite-dimensional vector space then it has a non-zero fixed vector. In fact, the latter property characterizes unipotent groups. In particular, this implies there are no non-trivial semisimple representations.

== Examples ==
=== U_{n} ===
Of course, the group of matrices $\mathbb{U}_n$ is unipotent. Using the lower central series

$$\mathbb{U}_n = \mathbb{U}_n^{(0)} \supset \mathbb{U}_n^{(1)} \supset \mathbb{U}_n^{(2)} \supset \cdots \supset \mathbb{U}_n^{(m)} = e$$

where

$\mathbb{U}_n^{(1)} = [\mathbb{U}_n,\mathbb{U}_n]$ and $\mathbb{U}_n^{(2)} = [\mathbb{U}_n, \mathbb{U}_n^{(1)}]$

there are associated unipotent groups. For example, on $n = 4$, the central series are the matrix groups

$$\mathbb{U}_4 = \left\{
\begin{bmatrix}
1 & * & * & * \\
0 & 1 & * & * \\
0 & 0 & 1 & * \\
0 & 0 & 0 & 1
\end{bmatrix}
\right\}$$,
$$\mathbb{U}_4^{(1)} = \left\{
\begin{bmatrix}
1 & 0 & * & * \\
0 & 1 & 0 & * \\
0 & 0 & 1 & 0 \\
0 & 0 & 0 & 1
\end{bmatrix}
\right\}$$,
$$\mathbb{U}_4^{(2)} = \left\{
\begin{bmatrix}
1 & 0 & 0 & * \\
0 & 1 & 0 & 0 \\
0 & 0 & 1 & 0 \\
0 & 0 & 0 & 1
\end{bmatrix}
\right\}$$
, and
$$\mathbb{U}_4^{(3)} = \left\{
\begin{bmatrix}
1 & 0 & 0 & 0 \\
0 & 1 & 0 & 0 \\
0 & 0 & 1 & 0 \\
0 & 0 & 0 & 1
\end{bmatrix}
\right\}$$

given some induced examples of unipotent groups.

=== G_{a}^{n} ===
The additive group $\mathbb{G}_a$ is a unipotent group through the embedding

$$a \mapsto \begin{bmatrix}
1 & a\\
0 & 1
\end{bmatrix}$$

Notice the matrix multiplication gives

$$\begin{bmatrix}
1 & a \\
0 & 1 \end{bmatrix} \cdot
\begin{bmatrix}
1 & b \\
0 & 1 \end{bmatrix} =
\begin{bmatrix}
1 & a + b \\
0 & 1 \end{bmatrix}$$

hence this is a group embedding. More generally, there is an embedding $\mathbb{G}_a^n \to \mathbb{U}_{n+1}$ from the map

$$(a_1,\ldots, a_n) \,\mapsto \begin{bmatrix}
1 & a_1 & a_2 & \cdots & a_{n-1} &a_n \\
0 & 1 & 0 & \cdots & 0 & 0 \\
\vdots & \vdots & \vdots & & \vdots & \vdots \\
0 & 0 & 0 & \cdots &1 & 0 \\
0 & 0 & 0 & \cdots &0 & 1
\end{bmatrix}$$

Using scheme theory, $\mathbb{G}_a$ is given by the functor

$$\mathcal{O}:\textbf{Sch}^{op} \to \textbf{Sets}$$

where

$$(X,\mathcal{O}_X) \mapsto \mathcal{O}_X(X)$$

=== Kernel of the Frobenius ===
Consider the functor $\mathcal{O}$ on the subcategory $\textbf{Sch}/\mathbb{F}_p$, there is the subfunctor $\alpha_p$ where

$$\alpha_p(X) = \{ x \in \mathcal{O}(X) : x^p = 0 \}$$

so it is given by the kernel of the Frobenius endomorphism.

== Classification of unipotent groups over characteristic 0 ==
Over characteristic 0 there is a nice classification of unipotent algebraic groups with respect to nilpotent Lie algebras. Recall that a nilpotent Lie algebra is a subalgebra of some $\mathfrak{gl}_n$ such that the iterated adjoint action eventually terminates to the zero-map. In terms of matrices, this means it is a subalgebra $\mathfrak{g}$ of $\mathfrak{n}_n$, the matrices with $a_{ij} = 0$ for $i \leq j$.

Then, there is an equivalence of categories of finite-dimensional nilpotent Lie algebras and unipotent algebraic groups.^{page 261} This can be constructed using the Baker–Campbell–Hausdorff series $H(X,Y)$, where given a finite-dimensional nilpotent Lie algebra, the map

$$H:\mathfrak{g}\times\mathfrak{g} \to \mathfrak{g} \text{ where } (X,Y)\mapsto H(X,Y)$$

gives a Unipotent algebraic group structure on $\mathfrak{g}$.

In the other direction the exponential map takes any nilpotent square matrix to a unipotent matrix. Moreover, if U is a commutative unipotent group, the exponential map induces an isomorphism from the Lie algebra of U to U itself.

=== Remarks ===
Unipotent groups over an algebraically closed field of any given dimension can in principle be classified, but in practice the complexity of the classification increases rapidly with the dimension, so some tend to give up somewhere around dimension 6.

== Unipotent radical ==
The unipotent radical of an algebraic group G is the set of unipotent elements in the radical of G. It is a connected unipotent normal subgroup of G, and contains all other such subgroups. A group is called reductive if its unipotent radical is trivial. If G is reductive then its radical is a torus.

== Decomposition of algebraic groups ==
Algebraic groups can be decomposed into unipotent groups, multiplicative groups, and abelian varieties, but the statement of how they decompose depends upon the characteristic of their base field.

=== Characteristic 0 ===
Over characteristic 0 there is a nice decomposition theorem of a commutative algebraic group $G$ relating its structure to the structure of a linear algebraic group and an Abelian variety. There is a short exact sequence of groups^{page 8}

$$0 \to M\times U \to G \to A \to 0$$

where $A$ is an abelian variety, $M$ is of multiplicative type (meaning, $M$ is, geometrically, a product of tori and algebraic groups of the form $\mu_n$) and $U$ is a unipotent group.

=== Characteristic p ===
When the characteristic of the base field is p there is an analogous statement for an algebraic group $G$: there exists a smallest subgroup $H$ such that

1. $G/H$ is a unipotent group
2. $H$ is an extension of an abelian variety $A$ by a group $M$ of multiplicative type.
3. $M$ is unique up to commensurability in $G$ and $A$ is unique up to isogeny.

== Jordan decomposition ==
Any element g of a linear algebraic group over a perfect field can be written uniquely as the product g = g_{u} g_{s} of commuting unipotent and semisimple elements g_{u} and g_{s}. In the case of the group GL_{n}(C), this essentially says that any invertible complex matrix is conjugate to the product of a diagonal matrix and an upper triangular one, which is (more or less) the multiplicative version of the Jordan–Chevalley decomposition.

There is also a version of the Jordan decomposition for groups: any commutative linear algebraic group over a perfect field is the product of a unipotent group and a semisimple group.

== See also ==
- Reductive group
- Unipotent representation
- Deligne–Lusztig theory
