= Tube domain =

In mathematics, a tube domain is a generalization of the notion of a vertical strip (or half-plane) in the complex plane to several complex variables. A strip can be thought of as the collection of complex numbers whose real part lie in a given subset of the real line and whose imaginary part is unconstrained; likewise, a tube is the set of complex vectors whose real part is in some given collection of real vectors, and whose imaginary part is unconstrained.

Tube domains are domains of the Laplace transform of a function of several real variables (see multidimensional Laplace transform). Hardy spaces on tubes can be defined in a manner in which a version of the Paley–Wiener theorem from one variable continues to hold, and characterizes the elements of Hardy spaces as the Laplace transforms of functions with appropriate integrability properties. Tubes over convex sets are domains of holomorphy. The Hardy spaces on tubes over convex cones have an especially rich structure, so that precise results are known concerning the boundary values of H^{p} functions. In mathematical physics, the future tube is the tube domain associated to the interior of the past null cone in Minkowski space, and has applications in relativity theory and quantum gravity. Certain tubes over cones support a Bergman metric in terms of which they become bounded symmetric domains. One of these is the Siegel half-space which is fundamental in arithmetic.

== Definition ==
Let R^{n} denote real coordinate space of dimension n and C^{n} denote complex coordinate space. Then any element of C^{n} can be decomposed into real and imaginary parts:

$$a=(z_1,\dots,z_n) = (x_1+iy_1, \dots, x_n+iy_n) = (x_1,\dots,x_n) + i(y_1,\dots,y_n)=x+iy.$$

Let A be an open subset of R^{n}. The tube over A, denoted T_{A}, is the subset of C^{n} consisting of all elements whose real parts lie in A: (Note: Some conventions instead define a tube to be a domain such that the imaginary part lies in A (Stein & Weiss 1971).)

$$T_A = \{ z=x+iy\in\mathbb{C}^n\mid x\in A\}.$$

== Tubes as domains of holomorphy ==
Suppose that A is a connected open set. Then any complex-valued function that is holomorphic in a tube T_{A} can be extended uniquely to a holomorphic function on the convex hull of the tube ch T_{A}, which is also a tube, and in fact

$$\operatorname{ch} \, T_A = T_{\operatorname{ch}\, A}.$$

Since any convex open set is a domain of holomorphy (holomorphically convex), a convex tube is also a domain of holomorphy. So the holomorphic envelope of any tube is equal to its convex hull.

== Hardy spaces ==
Let A be an open set in R^{n}. The Hardy space H^{p}(T_{A}) is the set of all holomorphic functions F in T_{A} such that

$$\int_{\mathbb{R}^n} |F(x+iy)|^p\, dy < \infty$$

for all x in A.

In the special case of p = 2, functions in H^{2}(T_{A}) can be characterized as follows. Let ƒ be a complex-valued function on R^{n} satisfying

$$\sup_{x\in A}\int_{\mathbb{R}^n}|f(t)|^2e^{-4\pi x\cdot t}\,dt < \infty.$$

The Fourier–Laplace transform of ƒ is defined by

$$F(x+iy) = \int_{\mathbb{R}^n}e^{2\pi z\cdot t}f(t)\,dt.$$

Then F is well-defined and belongs to H^{2}(T_{A}). Conversely, every element of H^{2}(T_{A}) has this form.

A corollary of this characterization is that H^{2}(T_{A}) contains a nonzero function if and only if A contains no straight line.

=== Tubes over cones ===
Let A be an open convex cone in R^{n}. This means that A is an open convex set such that, whenever x lies in A, so does the entire ray from the origin to x. Symbolically,

$$x\in A \implies tx\in A\ \ \ \text{for all}\ t>0.$$

If A is a cone, then the elements of H_{2}(T_{A}) have L^{2} boundary limits in the sense that

$$\lim_{y\to 0} F(x+iy)$$

exists in L^{2}(B). There is an analogous result for H^{p}(T_{A}), but it requires additional regularity of the cone (specifically, the dual cone A* needs to have nonempty interior).

== See also ==
- Reinhardt domain
- Siegel domain

== Sources ==
- Chirka, E.M. (2001) [First published 1994], "Tube domain", Encyclopedia of Mathematics, EMS Press.
- Gibbons, G.W. (2000), "Holography and the future tube", Classical and Quantum Gravity, 17 (5): 1071–1079, arXiv:hep-th/9911027, Bibcode:2000CQGra..17.1071G, doi:10.1088/0264-9381/17/5/316, S2CID 14045117.
- Hörmander, Lars (1990), Introduction to complex analysis in several variables, New York: North-Holland, ISBN 0-444-88446-7.
- Stein, Elias; Weiss, Guido (1971), Introduction to Fourier Analysis on Euclidean Spaces, Princeton, N.J.: Princeton University Press, ISBN 978-0-691-08078-9 – via Internet Archive.
- Carmignani, Robert (1973). "Envelopes of Holomorphy and Holomorphic Convexity". Transactions of the American Mathematical Society. 179: 415–431. doi:10.1090/S0002-9947-1973-0316748-1. hdl:1911/14576. JSTOR 1996512..
