= Siegel domain =

In mathematics, a Siegel domain or Piatetski-Shapiro domain is a special open subset of complex affine space generalizing the Siegel upper half plane studied by Siegel (1939). They were introduced by Piatetski-Shapiro (1959, 1969) in his study of bounded homogeneous domains.

== Definitions ==
A Siegel domain of the first kind (or first type, or genus 1) is the open subset of C^{m} of elements z such that

$$\Im(z)\in V \,$$

where V is an open convex cone in R^{m}. These are special cases of tube domains. An example is the Siegel upper half plane, where V⊂R^{k(k + 1)/2} is the cone of positive definite quadratic forms in R^{k} and m = k(k + 1)/2.

A Siegel domain of the second kind (or second type, or genus 2), also called a Piatetski-Shapiro domain, is the open subset of C^{m}×C^{n} of elements (z,w) such that

$$\Im(z)-F(w,w)\in V \,$$

where V is an open convex cone in R^{m} and F is a V-valued Hermitian form on C^{n}. If n = 0 this is a Siegel domain of the first kind.

A Siegel domain of the third kind (or third type, or genus 3) is the open subset of C^{m}×C^{n}×C^{k} of elements (z,w,t) such that

$\Im(z)-\Re L_t(w,w)\in V \,$ and t lies in some bounded region

where V is an open convex cone in R^{m} and L_{t} is a V-valued semi-Hermitian form on C^{n}.

== Bounded homogeneous domains ==
A bounded domain is an open connected bounded subset of a complex affine space. It is called homogeneous if its group of automorphisms acts transitively, and is called symmetric if for every point there is an automorphism acting as –1 on the tangent space. Bounded symmetric domains are homogeneous.

Élie Cartan classified the homogeneous bounded domains in dimension at most 3 (up to isomorphism), showing that they are all Hermitian symmetric spaces. There is 1 in dimension 1 (the unit ball), two in dimension 2 (the product of two 1-dimensional complex balls or a 2-dimensional complex ball). He asked whether all bounded homogeneous domains are symmetric. Piatetski-Shapiro (1959, 1959b) answered Cartan's question by finding a Siegel domain of type 2 in 4 dimensions that is homogeneous and biholomorphic to a bounded domain but not symmetric. In dimensions at least 7 there are infinite families of homogeneous bounded domains that are not symmetric.

È. B. Vinberg, S. G. Gindikin, and I. I. Piatetski-Shapiro (1963) showed that every bounded homogeneous domain is biholomorphic to a Siegel domain of type 1 or 2.

Wilhelm Kaup, Yozô Matsushima, and Takushiro Ochiai (1970) described the isomorphisms of Siegel domains of types 1 and 2 and the Lie algebra of automorphisms of a Siegel domain. In particular two Siegel domains are isomorphic if and only if they are isomorphic by an affine transformation.

== j-algebras ==
Suppose that G is the Lie algebra of a transitive connected group of analytic automorphisms of a bounded homogeneous domain X, and let K be the subalgebra fixing a point x. Then the almost complex structure j on X induces a vector space endomorphism j of G such that

- j^{2}=–1 on G/K
- [x,y] + j[jx,y] + j[x,jy] – [jx,jy] = 0 in G/K; this follows from the fact that the almost complex structure of X is integrable
- There is a linear form ω on G such that ω[jx,jy]=ω[x,y] and ω[jx,x]>0 if x∉K
- if L is a compact subalgebra of G with jL⊆K+L then L⊆K

A j-algebra is a Lie algebra G with a subalgebra K and a linear map j satisfying the properties above.

The Lie algebra of a connected Lie group acting transitively on a homogeneous bounded domain is a j-algebra, which is not surprising as j-algebras are defined to have the obvious properties of such a Lie algebra. The converse is also true: any j-algebra is the Lie algebra of some transitive group of automorphisms of a homogeneous bounded domain. This does not give a 1:1 correspondence between homogeneous bounded domains and j-algebras, because a homogeneous bounded domain can have several different Lie groups acting transitively on it.
