= Exceptional isomorphisms of classical groups =

Low-rank isomorphisms in mathematics

In mathematics, the exceptional isomorphisms of classical groups (also: accidental isomorphism or sporadic isogenies) are unexpected coincidences between different families of symmetry groups in small dimensions. They occur because some constructions that are different in general become equivalent at low rank. A trivial example is the familiar fact that the unit complex numbers form a group under complex multiplication, denoted $\mathrm U(1)$, that is the same as the group $\mathrm{SO}(2)$ of rotations of the Euclidean plane. A less trivial example is the double covering $\mathrm{SU}(2)\to\mathrm{SO}(3)$, which relates special unitary 2×2 matrices to rotations of 3-dimensional Euclidean space, and provides the simplest example of the connection between rotation groups and spinors.

More precisely, these are low-rank isomorphisms or central isogenies among classical algebraic groups that arise from accidental identifications of the corresponding root systems, specifically $A_1=B_1=C_1$, $D_2 = A_1\times A_1$, $B_2=C_2$, and $A_3=D_3$. These isomorphisms may be realized concretely through small linear representations, and over the real numbers they give rise to corresponding isomorphisms for several noncompact real forms. Some, such as $\mathrm{Spin}^+(1,3)\cong\mathrm{SL}(2,\mathbf C)$ and $\mathrm{Spin}^+(2,4)\cong\mathrm{SU}(2,2)$, have applications in general relativity, string theory, and other areas of mathematical physics.

Over more general fields, these exceptional isomorphisms persist for non-split forms and are described uniformly using central simple algebras with involution, Clifford algebras, and related constructions. In this form they identify not only split orthogonal, symplectic, and unitary groups, but also their inner and outer forms. These exceptional isomorphisms are important in the structure theory of algebraic groups and in the study of automorphic forms, theta correspondence, and the Langlands program.

== Over algebraically closed fields ==
Over an algebraically closed field of characteristic not 2, the exceptional isomorphisms of classical groups arise from accidental identifications among the low-rank Dynkin diagrams and the corresponding root systems. At the level of simple Lie algebras these are
$$A_1=B_1=C_1,\qquad
A_1\times A_1=D_2,\qquad
B_2=C_2,\qquad
A_3=D_3.$$
Passing from Lie algebras to simply connected algebraic groups gives the corresponding low-rank isomorphisms among the classical groups.

Diagram	Dynkin classification	Lie algebra	Simply connected group
	$A_1=B_1=C_1$	$\mathfrak{sl}_2 \cong \mathfrak{so}_3 \cong \mathfrak{sp}_2$	$\mathrm{SL}_2 \cong \mathrm{Spin}_3 \cong \mathrm{Sp}_2$
$\cong$	$A_1\times A_1=D_2$	$\mathfrak{sl}_2\oplus\mathfrak{sl}_2 \cong \mathfrak{so}_4$	$\mathrm{SL}_2\times\mathrm{SL}_2 \cong \mathrm{Spin}_4$
	$B_2=C_2$	$\mathfrak{so}_5 \cong \mathfrak{sp}_4$	$\mathrm{Spin}_5 \cong \mathrm{Sp}_4$
$\cong$	$A_3=D_3$	$\mathfrak{sl}_4 \cong \mathfrak{so}_6$	$\mathrm{SL}_4 \cong \mathrm{Spin}_6$

In low dimensions these isomorphisms also admit concrete topological realizations. The circle group may be identified with the rotation group of the Euclidean plane,
$$\mathrm U(1)\cong \mathrm{SO}(2),$$
and the group of unit quaternions gives the compact form
$$\mathrm{SU}(2)\cong \mathrm{Spin}(3)\cong \mathrm{Sp}(1).$$
Continuing in this way gives
$$\mathrm{Spin}(4)\cong \mathrm{SU}(2)\times \mathrm{SU}(2),\qquad
\mathrm{Spin}(5)\cong \mathrm{Sp}(2),\qquad
\mathrm{Spin}(6)\cong \mathrm{SU}(4).$$
These are the compact real forms of the complex isomorphisms listed above.

Closely related, though not itself an isomorphism between different classical-group families, is the exceptional triality automorphism of Spin(8).

== Real forms ==
The same low-rank coincidences produce corresponding isomorphisms for noncompact real forms. In particular,
$$\mathrm{Spin}^+(1,2) \cong \mathrm{SL}(2,\mathbb R),\qquad
\mathrm{Spin}^+(1,3) \cong \mathrm{SL}(2,\mathbb C),\qquad
\mathrm{Spin}^+(2,2) \cong \mathrm{SL}(2,\mathbb R)\times\mathrm{SL}(2,\mathbb R),$$
and similarly
$$\mathrm{Spin}^+(1,4) \cong \mathrm{Sp}(1,1),\qquad
\mathrm{Spin}^+(2,3) \cong \mathrm{Sp}(4,\mathbb R),$$
as well as
$$\mathrm{Spin}^+(2,4) \cong \mathrm{SU}(2,2),\qquad
\mathrm{Spin}^+(3,3) \cong \mathrm{SL}(4,\mathbb R),\qquad
\mathrm{Spin}^+(1,5) \cong \mathrm{SL}(2,\mathbb H)\cong \mathrm{SU}^*(4).$$
Here $\mathrm{Spin}^+$ denotes the identity component of the corresponding spin group. Depending on convention, these relationships may also be presented as central isogenies or as isomorphisms of the associated Lie algebras.

== Explicit constructions ==
These exceptional isomorphisms can be constructed by exhibiting small linear representations that preserve a nondegenerate quadratic form. In each case one obtains a homomorphism to some $\mathrm{SO}(p,q)$ with kernel $\{\pm I\}$, and the source group is thereby identified with the corresponding spin group. The various signatures arise by taking different real forms of the same complex construction.

=== Dimension 3 ===
The 3-dimensional cases come from conjugation on traceless $2\times 2$ matrices. If
$$V=\{x\in M_2(k):\operatorname{tr}(x)=0\},$$
with quadratic form
$$q(x)=-\det(x)$$
(equivalently $q(x)=\tfrac12\operatorname{tr}(x^2)$), then the action
$$g\cdot x=gxg^{-1}$$
preserves $q$. Over $\mathbf C$ this gives a homomorphism
$$\mathrm{SL}(2,\mathbf C)\to \mathrm{SO}(3,\mathbf C).$$
Choosing the compact or split real form yields
$$\mathrm{SU}(2)\to \mathrm{SO}(3),\qquad
\mathrm{SL}(2,\mathbf R)\to \mathrm{SO}(2,1).$$

A closely related construction gives the Lorentzian case. Let $V$ be the real vector space of Hermitian $2\times2$ complex matrices, again equipped with the quadratic form $q(x)=-\det(x)$. Then $\mathrm{SL}(2,\mathbf C)$ acts by
$$x\mapsto gxg^*,$$
preserving $q$. This is the usual action on Minkowski space and gives
$$\mathrm{Spin}^+(1,3)\cong \mathrm{SL}(2,\mathbf C).$$

=== Dimension 4 ===
The 4-dimensional cases come from left and right multiplication on $M_2(k)$. The quadratic form is again the determinant,
$$q(x)=\det(x),$$
which is preserved by the action
$$(g,h)\cdot x=gxh^{-1}.$$
Over $\mathbf C$ this gives
$$\mathrm{SL}(2,\mathbf C)\times \mathrm{SL}(2,\mathbf C)\to \mathrm{SO}(4,\mathbf C),$$
while over $\mathbf R$ it gives
$$\mathrm{SL}(2,\mathbf R)\times \mathrm{SL}(2,\mathbf R)\to \mathrm{SO}(2,2).$$
On the quaternionic real form one recovers the compact case
$$\mathrm{SU}(2)\times \mathrm{SU}(2)\to \mathrm{SO}(4),$$
and hence
$$\mathrm{Spin}(4)\cong \mathrm{Sp}(1)\times \mathrm{Sp}(1)\cong \mathrm{SU}(2)\times \mathrm{SU}(2).$$

=== Dimension 5 ===
The 5-dimensional cases are obtained from trace-free self-adjoint matrices. For quaternionic Hermitian $2\times2$ matrices, the reduced-trace quadratic form on the trace-free subspace is 5-dimensional and is preserved by
$$x\mapsto gxg^*,$$
where the adjoint is taken with respect to the Hermitian form on $\mathbb H^2$ of the appropriate signature. This yields homomorphisms
$$\mathrm{Sp}(2)\to \mathrm{SO}(5),\qquad
\mathrm{Sp}(1,1)\to \mathrm{SO}(4,1),$$
and therefore the exceptional isomorphisms
$$\mathrm{Spin}(5)\cong \mathrm{Sp}(2),\qquad
\mathrm{Spin}^+(1,4)\cong \mathrm{Sp}(1,1).$$

A split analogue uses the symplectic involution on $M_4(\mathbf R)$. The trace-free symplectically self-adjoint subspace is again 5-dimensional, and conjugation by $\mathrm{Sp}(4,\mathbf R)$ preserves its quadratic form. This gives
$$\mathrm{Spin}^+(2,3)\cong \mathrm{Sp}(4,\mathbf R).$$

=== Dimension 6 ===
The 6-dimensional cases come from the exterior square of a 4-dimensional module. On $\Lambda^2(k^4)$ there is a natural symmetric bilinear form defined by
$$x\wedge y=\langle x,y\rangle\,\omega,$$
where $\omega\in \Lambda^4(k^4)\setminus\{0\}$ is a fixed volume form. Since $\mathrm{SL}(4,k)$ preserves $\omega$, it preserves this bilinear form. Over $\mathbf C$ this gives
$$\mathrm{SL}(4,\mathbf C)\to \mathrm{SO}(6,\mathbf C),$$
and over $\mathbf R$ it gives
$$\mathrm{SL}(4,\mathbf R)\to \mathrm{SO}(3,3).$$

Further real forms arise from additional structures on $\mathbf C^4$. If $\mathbf C^4$ is equipped with a positive-definite Hermitian form, a Hermitian form of signature $(2,2)$, or a quaternionic structure, then the induced conjugate-linear involution on $\Lambda^2\mathbf C^4$ has a real 6-dimensional fixed subspace on which the same bilinear form has signature $(6,0)$, $(4,2)$, or $(5,1)$. This yields
$$\mathrm{Spin}(6)\cong \mathrm{SU}(4),\qquad
\mathrm{Spin}^+(2,4)\cong \mathrm{SU}(2,2),\qquad
\mathrm{Spin}^+(1,5)\cong \mathrm{SL}(2,\mathbf H)\cong \mathrm{SU}^*(4).$$

In all of these constructions the kernel is $\{\pm I\}$, so the maps are the standard double covers of the corresponding special orthogonal groups. These constructions realize geometrically the low-dimensional root-system equalities
$$A_1=B_1=C_1,\qquad
A_1\times A_1=D_2,\qquad
B_2=C_2,\qquad
A_3=D_3.$$

== General fields ==
The exceptional isomorphisms between classical groups extend beyond the split case and admit a uniform description over arbitrary fields using central simple algebras with involution. In this formulation, orthogonal, symplectic, and unitary groups arise from algebras equipped with involutions, and the low-rank coincidences $B_2=C_2$ and $A_3=D_3$ persist for all such forms.

More precisely, the isomorphism $B_2=C_2$ identifies symplectic groups attached to degree-4 algebras with symplectic involution with spin groups attached to 5-dimensional quadratic spaces, via constructions involving trace-zero symmetric elements and the Pfaffian norm. Similarly, the isomorphism $A_3=D_3$ relates unitary groups of degree 4, defined using a quadratic étale algebra and a unitary involution, to spin groups in dimension 6, via Clifford algebras and discriminant algebras. In the split case these constructions reduce to the realization on $\Lambda^2 F^4$, but over general fields they describe all inner and outer forms of the corresponding groups.

These phenomena are controlled by Galois cohomology, which classifies forms of reductive algebraic groups. The exceptional isomorphisms therefore identify not only the split groups but also their twisted forms over local and global fields. This has consequences in the theory of automorphic forms and the Langlands program, where low-rank orthogonal and general spin groups are often studied via symplectic, linear, or unitary groups using functorial transfer and theta correspondence.

=== Overview ===
Over a field $F$ of characteristic different from 2, the low-rank exceptional isomorphisms of root systems $B_2=C_2$ and $A_3=D_3$ give rise to corresponding isomorphisms (or central isogenies) among classical algebraic groups. In the split case, these include
$$\operatorname{Spin}_5 \cong \operatorname{Sp}_4,\qquad \operatorname{SO}_5 \cong \operatorname{PGSp}_4,\qquad \operatorname{GSpin}_5 \cong \operatorname{GSp}_4,$$
and
$$\operatorname{Spin}_6 \cong \operatorname{SL}_4,\qquad \operatorname{SO}_6 \cong \operatorname{PGL}_4.$$
These identifications arise from explicit constructions: for $B_2=C_2$, from the action of $\operatorname{Sp}_4$ on the 5-dimensional irreducible summand of $\Lambda^2 F^4$; and for $A_3=D_3$, from the action of $\operatorname{SL}_4$ on $\Lambda^2 F^4$.

The non-split forms can be described using central simple algebras with involution. Let $A$ be a simple algebra over $F$ with center $Z(A)$. An involution $\sigma:A\to A$ is said to be of the first kind if it acts trivially on $Z(A)$, and of the second kind otherwise. In the latter case, $Z(A)$ is a quadratic étale extension $K/F$ (that is, either $K=F\times F$ or a separable quadratic field extension), and $\sigma$ induces the nontrivial $F$-automorphism of $K$. Involutions of the first kind are further classified as orthogonal or symplectic, while those of the second kind are called unitary.

For the exceptional isomorphism $A_3=D_3$, the non-split form may be described as follows. On the $A_3$ side, one considers a central simple algebra $B$ of degree 4 over a quadratic étale algebra $K/F$, equipped with a unitary involution $\tau$. On the $D_3$ side, one considers a central simple algebra $A$ of degree 6 over $F$, equipped with an orthogonal involution $\sigma$. There is a canonical correspondence between such pairs $(B,\tau)$ and $(A,\sigma)$, under which one obtains isomorphisms of algebraic groups
$$\operatorname{SU}(B,\tau)\cong \operatorname{Spin}(A,\sigma),\qquad \operatorname{PGU}(B,\tau)\cong \operatorname{PGO}^+(A,\sigma).$$
In the split case $K=F\times F$ and $B\cong M_4(F)$, this reduces to the classical identifications $\operatorname{SL}_4\cong \operatorname{Spin}_6$ and $\operatorname{PGL}_4\cong \operatorname{SO}_6$.

For $B_2=C_2$, the non-split form relates symplectic and orthogonal groups. If $(A,\tau)$ is a central simple algebra of degree 4 over $F$ with symplectic involution, then there is a canonically associated 5-dimensional quadratic space $(V,q)$, and corresponding isomorphisms
$$\operatorname{Sp}(A,\tau)\cong \operatorname{Spin}(V,q),\qquad \operatorname{GSp}(A,\tau)\cong \operatorname{GSpin}(V,q),\qquad \operatorname{PGSp}(A,\tau)\cong \operatorname{SO}(V,q).$$
Conversely, every 5-dimensional quadratic space arises in this way from the even Clifford algebra. In the split case this recovers the isomorphisms $\operatorname{Sp}_4\cong \operatorname{Spin}_5$ and $\operatorname{PGSp}_4\cong \operatorname{SO}_5$.

=== Explicit constructions ===
==== Split isomorphisms ====
In the split cases, the constructions are similar to the exceptional isomorphisms over the complex numbers.

If $(W,\omega)$ is a 4-dimensional symplectic space, then contraction with $\omega$ defines a map $\Lambda^2W\to F$, and its kernel
$$\Lambda^2_0W=\ker(\Lambda^2W\to F)$$
is a 5-dimensional subspace carrying a natural quadratic form preserved by $\operatorname{Sp}(W,\omega)$.

For the $A_3=D_3$ isomorphism in the split case, if $U$ is a 4-dimensional vector space, then $\Lambda^2U$ is 6-dimensional and carries a natural symmetric bilinear form, defined by identifying $\Lambda^4U$ with $F$; this form is preserved by $\operatorname{SL}(U)$, giving the homomorphism $\operatorname{SL}_4\to \operatorname{SO}_6$.

==== Non-split isomorphisms ====
To describe the non-split forms more explicitly, one uses standard constructions from the theory of central simple algebras with involution. Throughout this subsection, assume that the characteristic of $F$ is not equal to 2.

If $(A,\tau)$ is a central simple algebra over $F$ with symplectic involution, define
$$\operatorname{Sym}(A,\tau)=\{x\in A:\tau(x)=x\}.$$
There is also a reduced trace map
$$\operatorname{Trd}_A:A\to F,$$
which in the split case $A=M_n(F)$ is the ordinary matrix trace. One defines the trace-zero subspace
$$\operatorname{Sym}(A,\tau)^0=\{x\in \operatorname{Sym}(A,\tau):\operatorname{Trd}_A(x)=0\}.$$

If $A$ has degree 4, then $\operatorname{Sym}(A,\tau)^0$ is a 5-dimensional vector space over $F$. The involution $\tau$ determines a quadratic form on this space, called the Pfaffian norm, denoted $q_\tau$. In the split case $A=M_4(F)$ with the standard symplectic involution, this quadratic form is the natural quadratic form on the 5-dimensional irreducible summand of $\Lambda^2 F^4$.

More concretely, if $\operatorname{char}(F)\ne 2$, the reduced norm $\operatorname{Nrd}_A$ satisfies
$$\operatorname{Nrd}_A(x)=q_\tau(x)^2 \qquad \text{for } x\in \operatorname{Sym}(A,\tau),$$
and $q_\tau$ is uniquely determined by this property. This quadratic form is nondegenerate on $\operatorname{Sym}(A,\tau)^0$.

This construction yields the exceptional isomorphisms
$$\operatorname{Sp}(A,\tau)\cong \operatorname{Spin}\bigl(\operatorname{Sym}(A,\tau)^0,q_\tau\bigr),$$
$$\operatorname{GSp}(A,\tau)\cong \operatorname{GSpin}\bigl(\operatorname{Sym}(A,\tau)^0,q_\tau\bigr),$$
$$\operatorname{PGSp}(A,\tau)\cong \operatorname{SO}\bigl(\operatorname{Sym}(A,\tau)^0,q_\tau\bigr).$$

Conversely, if $(V,q)$ is a 5-dimensional quadratic space, one forms its Clifford algebra $C(V,q)$ and its even Clifford algebra $C_0(V,q)$. The algebra $C_0(V,q)$ is a central simple algebra of degree 4 over $F$, equipped with a canonical symplectic involution $\tau$, and the above construction recovers $(V,q)$ up to isomorphism.

For the exceptional isomorphism $A_3=D_3$, one proceeds as follows. Let $K/F$ be a quadratic étale algebra, and let $B$ be a central simple algebra of degree 4 over $K$ equipped with a unitary involution $\tau$. Thus $\tau$ induces the nontrivial $F$-automorphism of $K$ (Galois conjugation in the field case, or exchange of the two factors if $K=F\times F$).

From $(B,\tau)$ one constructs a central simple algebra $A$ of degree 6 over $F$, equipped with an orthogonal involution $\sigma$, called the discriminant algebra of $(B,\tau)$. In the split case $B\cong M_4(F)\times M_4(F)^{\mathrm{op}}$, this corresponds to the action of $\operatorname{SL}_4$ on $\Lambda^2 F^4$, which preserves a natural quadratic form and yields the isomorphism $\operatorname{SL}_4\cong \operatorname{Spin}_6$.

Conversely, if $(A,\sigma)$ is a central simple algebra of degree 6 over $F$ with orthogonal involution, its Clifford algebra $C(A,\sigma)$ has center a quadratic étale algebra $K/F$, and one obtains a degree-4 central simple algebra over $K$ equipped with a canonical unitary involution. These constructions are mutually inverse up to isomorphism, and give
$$\operatorname{SU}(B,\tau)\cong \operatorname{Spin}(A,\sigma),\qquad
\operatorname{PGU}(B,\tau)\cong \operatorname{PGO}^+(A,\sigma).$$

=== Characteristic 2 ===
The preceding descriptions are simplest over fields of characteristic different from 2. In characteristic 2, the orthogonal side is more naturally expressed in terms of quadratic pairs rather than orthogonal involutions: if $(A,\sigma,f)$ is a central simple algebra with quadratic pair, then $\sigma$ is a symplectic involution, and the additional linear form $f$ is needed to recover the corresponding quadratic form.

(A quadratic pair on a central simple algebra $A$ over a field $F$ is a pair $(\sigma,f)$, where $\sigma$ is an involution of the first kind on $A$ and
$$f:\operatorname{Sym}(A,\sigma)\to F$$
is a linear map satisfying
$$f(x+\sigma(x))=\operatorname{Trd}_A(x)\qquad\text{for all }x\in A.$$
When $\operatorname{char}(F)\neq 2$, this notion is equivalent to that of an orthogonal involution, since $f$ is then determined by $\sigma$. In characteristic $2$, however, an involution alone does not determine the corresponding quadratic data, and the extra linear form $f$ is needed. Quadratic pairs are therefore the natural characteristic-2 analogue of orthogonal involutions.)

For the exceptional isomorphism $B_2=C_2$, let $(A,\tau)$ be a central simple algebra of degree 4 with symplectic involution. In characteristic 2, the relevant 5-dimensional quadratic space is built from the space
$$\operatorname{Symd}(A,\tau)=\{x+\tau(x):x\in A\}$$
of symmetrized elements, rather than from $\operatorname{Sym}(A,\tau)$. More precisely, Knus–Merkurjev–Rost–Tignol identify the corresponding quadratic space with
$$\bigl(\operatorname{Symd}(A,\tau)^0,s_\tau\bigr),$$
where $\operatorname{Symd}(A,\tau)^0$ is the trace-zero subspace and $s_\tau$ is the Pfaffian trace form. In this way the exceptional isomorphism persists in characteristic 2, but the orthogonal group is replaced by the group attached to this quadratic space, and the resulting map is best understood as an isogeny of algebraic groups rather than as a classical double cover with kernel $\{\pm I\}$.

For the exceptional isomorphism $A_3=D_3$, the correct characteristic-2 object on the $D_3$ side is a central simple algebra of degree 6 with quadratic pair $(A,\sigma,f)$. Its Clifford algebra is then a central simple algebra of degree 4 over a quadratic étale extension, equipped with a canonical unitary involution. Conversely, a degree-4 central simple algebra with unitary involution has an associated discriminant algebra of degree 6 with quadratic pair. Thus the equivalence between the $A_3$ and $D_3$ forms remains valid in characteristic 2, but it is expressed using quadratic pairs rather than orthogonal involutions.

In the split case, the construction using the action of $\mathrm{SL}_4$ on $\Lambda^2(F^4)$ still gives the corresponding low-rank isogeny, but the invariant structure on the orthogonal side is again a quadratic pair. Likewise, the $B_2=C_2$ construction may still be viewed through the 5-dimensional summand attached to a degree-4 symplectic algebra, provided it is formulated in terms of $\operatorname{Symd}(A,\tau)^0$ and the quadratic form $s_\tau$.

== Applications ==
The exceptional isomorphisms of classical groups have important applications in both mathematics and physics. In low dimensions they allow orthogonal and spin groups to be replaced by matrix groups of smaller degree, making many constructions more explicit. This is especially important in general relativity, quantum mechanics, twistor theory, and the theory of automorphic forms.

=== Spinor calculus in general relativity ===
The isomorphism
$$\mathrm{Spin}^+(1,3)\cong \mathrm{SL}(2,\mathbf C)$$
is the basis of the two-spinor calculus used in four-dimensional Lorentzian geometry and general relativity. In this formalism, tensors on spacetime are rewritten in terms of spinor indices, and the Lorentz group acts through the defining 2-dimensional representation of $\mathrm{SL}(2,\mathbf C)$. This makes it possible to express null vectors, Weyl and Ricci curvature, and many field equations in a particularly compact form. The compact real form
$$\mathrm{Spin}(3)\cong \mathrm{SU}(2)$$
likewise governs the spin degrees of freedom associated with spatial rotations.

=== Pauli and Dirac matrix formalisms ===
The same low-dimensional isomorphisms underlie the use of Pauli matrices and gamma matrices in quantum mechanics and relativistic quantum theory. The Pauli matrices realize the Lie algebra of $\mathrm{SU}(2)$ and describe spin-1/2 systems under ordinary spatial rotations, while the double covering
$$\mathrm{SL}(2,\mathbf C)\to \mathrm{SO}^+(1,3)$$
allows Lorentz vectors to be represented by Hermitian $2\times2$ matrices and Lorentz transformations to be expressed by
$$X\mapsto AXA^*.$$
This is the standard bridge between two-component spinors, four-vectors, and the matrix formalism used in relativistic wave equations.

=== Twistor theory and conformal geometry ===
Twistor theory uses the exceptional isomorphism
$$\mathrm{Spin}^+(2,4)\cong \mathrm{SU}(2,2),$$
which identifies the spin group of the conformal group of four-dimensional Minkowski space with a unitary group of signature $(2,2)$. Twistor space is naturally a complex 4-dimensional vector space equipped with an $\mathrm{SU}(2,2)$-invariant Hermitian form, and the conformal geometry of spacetime is encoded in the incidence relation between spacetime points and projective lines in twistor space. In this way, the exceptional isomorphism is built into the basic symmetry group of twistor geometry.

=== Automorphic forms and the Langlands program ===
Exceptional isomorphisms also play a role in the theory of automorphic representations by allowing low-rank orthogonal and spin groups to be studied through symplectic or linear groups. For example, the identification
$$\mathrm{GSpin}_5 \cong \mathrm{GSp}_4$$
relates automorphic forms on a general spin group to the well-developed theory of Siegel modular forms of genus 2, while
$$\mathrm{Spin}_6 \cong \mathrm{SL}_4$$
and related isogenies connect low-rank orthogonal groups with linear groups. These identifications are used in the formulation of Langlands functoriality, local and global transfer, and instances of the local Langlands correspondence.

=== Conformal field theory and string theory ===
A related application occurs in conformal and superconformal field theory, where
$$\mathrm{Spin}^+(2,4)\cong \mathrm{SU}(2,2)$$
identifies the spin group of the four-dimensional conformal group with the bosonic symmetry group appearing in many formulations of conformal field theory. In the best-known example, the symmetry supergroup of the $\mathrm{AdS}_5\times S^5$ correspondence is $\mathrm{PSU}(2,2|4)$, whose bosonic part contains $\mathrm{SU}(2,2)$ and $\mathrm{SU}(4)$; these are the exceptional low-rank real forms corresponding to $\mathrm{Spin}(2,4)$ and $\mathrm{Spin}(6)$.
