= Signature cocycle =

In mathematics, the Meyer signature cocycle, introduced by Meyer (1973). is an integer-valued 2-cocyle on a symplectic group that describes the signature of a fiber bundle whose base and fiber are both Riemann surfaces.
