= Classical group =

Type of group in mathematics

In mathematics, the classical groups are the matrix groups arising from finite-dimensional vector spaces and from nondegenerate bilinear, sesquilinear, quadratic, and Hermitian forms. In the traditional setting of Lie groups, this includes the real, complex, and quaternionic general linear, special linear, orthogonal, unitary, and symplectic groups, together with their indefinite analogues.

In the language of linear algebraic groups, the connected classical groups are the connected reductive groups of Dynkin types $A_n$, $B_n$, $C_n$, and $D_n$, together with their forms over arbitrary fields. Over $\mathbb R$ and $\mathbb C$ this recovers the familiar classical Lie groups, while over finite fields one obtains the finite classical groups.

The term goes back to Hermann Weyl's book The Classical Groups. Among the simple Lie groups, the classical groups are in contrast to the exceptional Lie groups, G_{2}, F_{4}, E_{6}, E_{7}, E_{8}, which share their abstract properties, but not their familiarity.

This article begins with the classical Lie groups over $\mathbb R$, $\mathbb C$, and $\mathbb H$, and later discusses the more general formulation over arbitrary fields.

== Overview ==
Two closely related usages of the term classical group occur in the literature. In the older matrix-group literature, classical groups are the linear groups over $\mathbb R$, $\mathbb C$, and $\mathbb H$ together with the groups preserving nondegenerate forms on those spaces. In the modern theory of algebraic groups, the phrase usually refers to the groups of types $A$, $B$, $C$, and $D$ and their forms over general fields.

For the purposes of this article, the main families are:

- the linear groups $\mathrm{GL}(V)$ and $\mathrm{SL}(V)$;
- the orthogonal groups attached to nondegenerate quadratic or symmetric bilinear forms;
- the symplectic groups attached to nondegenerate alternating forms;
- the unitary groups attached to nondegenerate Hermitian forms relative to an involution.

Over $\mathbb C$, the connected simple classical Lie groups are the families of types $A_n$, $B_n$, $C_n$, and $D_n$. Their compact real forms are $\mathrm{SU}(n)$, $\mathrm{SO}(n)$, and $\mathrm{Sp}(n)$.

The standard real, complex, and quaternionic classical groups are given in the following table:

Name	Group	Field	Form preserved	Maximal compact subgroup	Lie algebra	Root system
Special linear	$\mathrm{SL}(n,\mathbb{R})$	$\mathbb{R}$	—	$\mathrm{SO}(n)$	$\mathfrak{sl}_n(\mathbb{R})$	$A_{n-1}$
Complex special linear	$\mathrm{SL}(n,\mathbb{C})$	$\mathbb{C}$	—	$\mathrm{SU}(n)$	$\mathfrak{sl}_n(\mathbb{C})$	$A_{n-1}$
Quaternionic special linear	$\mathrm{SL}(n,\mathbb{H}) \cong \mathrm{SU}^*(2n)$	$\mathbb{H}$	—	$\mathrm{Sp}(n)$	$\mathfrak{su}^*(2n)$	$A_{2n-1}$
(Indefinite) special orthogonal	$\mathrm{SO}(p,q)$	$\mathbb{R}$	Symmetric bilinear	$S(\mathrm{O}(p)\times \mathrm{O}(q))$	$\mathfrak{so}(p,q)$	$B_m$ if $p+q=2m+1$; $D_m$ if $p+q=2m$
Complex special orthogonal	$\mathrm{SO}(n,\mathbb{C})$	$\mathbb{C}$	Symmetric bilinear	$\mathrm{SO}(n)$	$\mathfrak{so}_n(\mathbb{C})$	$B_m$ if $n=2m+1$; $D_m$ if $n=2m$
Real symplectic	$\mathrm{Sp}(2n,\mathbb{R})$	$\mathbb{R}$	Alternating bilinear	$\mathrm{U}(n)$	$\mathfrak{sp}_{2n}(\mathbb{R})$	$C_n$
Complex symplectic	$\mathrm{Sp}(2n,\mathbb{C})$	$\mathbb{C}$	Alternating bilinear	$\mathrm{Sp}(n)$	$\mathfrak{sp}_{2n}(\mathbb{C})$	$C_n$
(Indefinite) special unitary	$\mathrm{SU}(p,q)$	$\mathbb{C}$	Hermitian	$S(\mathrm{U}(p)\times \mathrm{U}(q))$	$\mathfrak{su}(p,q)$	$A_{p+q-1}$
(Indefinite) quaternionic unitary	$\mathrm{Sp}(p,q)$	$\mathbb{H}$	Hermitian	$\mathrm{Sp}(p)\times \mathrm{Sp}(q)$	$\mathfrak{sp}(p,q)$	$C_{p+q}$
Quaternionic orthogonal	$\mathrm{SO}^*(2n)$	$\mathbb{H}$	Skew-Hermitian	$\mathrm{U}(n)$	$\mathfrak{so}^*(2n)$	$D_n$

== Linear groups ==
=== Real and complex special linear groups ===
For $F=\mathbb R$ or $\mathbb C$, the special linear group is

$$\mathrm{SL}(n,F)=\{g\in \mathrm{GL}_n(F)\mid \det g=1\}.$$

Its Lie algebra is

$$\mathfrak{sl}(n,F)=\{X\in M_n(F)\mid \operatorname{tr}(X)=0\}.$$

Thus $\mathfrak{sl}(n,\mathbb R)$ consists of all real traceless $n\times n$ matrices, and $\mathfrak{sl}(n,\mathbb C)$ consists of all complex traceless $n\times n$ matrices.

== Forms and automorphism groups ==
The classical groups are most naturally described as automorphism groups of nondegenerate forms on finite-dimensional vector spaces.

Let $V$ be a finite-dimensional vector space over $\mathbb R$ or $\mathbb C$. A bilinear form on $V$ is a map

$$\varphi\colon V\times V\to F$$

that is linear in each variable. A sesquilinear form on a complex vector space is a map

$$\varphi\colon V\times V\to \mathbb C$$

that is conjugate-linear in the first variable and linear in the second.

For quaternionic vector spaces one usually works with right $\mathbb H$-vector spaces. In that setting the relevant forms are quaternionic Hermitian or quaternionic skew-Hermitian forms, which are conjugate-linear in the first variable and linear in the second.

If $\varphi$ is a nondegenerate form on $V$, its automorphism group is

$$\operatorname{Aut}(\varphi)=\{g\in \operatorname{GL}(V)\mid \varphi(gv,gw)=\varphi(v,w)\text{ for all }v,w\in V\}.$$

After a choice of basis, $\varphi$ is represented by a Gram matrix $\Phi$, and $\operatorname{Aut}(\varphi)$ becomes a matrix group defined by one of the equations

$$g^{\mathrm T}\Phi g=\Phi,\qquad g^*\Phi g=\Phi,$$

according to whether $\varphi$ is bilinear or sesquilinear.

The Lie algebra of $\operatorname{Aut}(\varphi)$ is

$$\mathfrak{aut}(\varphi)=\{X\in \operatorname{End}(V)\mid \varphi(Xv,w)+\varphi(v,Xw)=0\text{ for all }v,w\in V\},$$

or, in matrix form,

$X^{\mathrm T}\Phi+\Phi X=0,\qquad X^*\Phi+\Phi X=0.$

=== Symmetric, alternating, Hermitian, and skew-Hermitian forms ===
A bilinear form $\varphi$ is:

- symmetric if $\varphi(v,w)=\varphi(w,v)$;
- alternating (or skew-symmetric, when $\operatorname{char}F\neq 2$) if $\varphi(v,v)=0$ for all $v$, equivalently $\varphi(v,w)=-\varphi(w,v)$.

A sesquilinear form $h$ is:

- Hermitian if $h(v,w)=\overline{h(w,v)}$;
- skew-Hermitian if $h(v,w)=-\overline{h(w,v)}$.

Over $\mathbb R$, nondegenerate symmetric bilinear forms are classified by their signature $(p,q)$. Over $\mathbb C$, all nondegenerate symmetric bilinear forms of a given dimension are equivalent. Nondegenerate alternating forms exist only in even dimension, and over both $\mathbb R$ and $\mathbb C$ all such forms are equivalent.

On a complex vector space, multiplying a skew-Hermitian form by $i$ yields a Hermitian form, so the two cases lead to the same isometry groups up to a harmless change of convention. On a quaternionic vector space, by contrast, there are no nonzero bilinear forms, so only the Hermitian and skew-Hermitian cases occur.

== Groups preserving bilinear forms ==
=== Orthogonal groups ===
Let $\varphi$ be a nondegenerate symmetric bilinear form.

Over $\mathbb R$, one may choose a basis in which

$$\varphi(x,y)=x^{\mathrm T}I_{p,q}y,\qquad I_{p,q}=\operatorname{diag}(I_p,-I_q),$$

where $p+q=n$. Its automorphism group is the indefinite orthogonal group

$$\mathrm O(p,q)=\{g\in \mathrm{GL}_n(\mathbb R)\mid g^{\mathrm T}I_{p,q}g=I_{p,q}\}.$$

The subgroup of determinant $1$ is the special orthogonal group

$\mathrm{SO}(p,q)=\mathrm O(p,q)\cap \mathrm{SL}_n(\mathbb R).$

When $q=0$ this is the compact orthogonal group $\mathrm O(n)$, with determinant-$1$ subgroup $\mathrm{SO}(n)$.

Over $\mathbb C$, every nondegenerate symmetric bilinear form is equivalent to the standard form

$$\varphi(x,y)=x^{\mathrm T}y.$$

Its automorphism group is the complex orthogonal group

$$\mathrm O(n,\mathbb C)=\{g\in \mathrm{GL}_n(\mathbb C)\mid g^{\mathrm T}g=I_n\},$$

with determinant-$1$ subgroup $\mathrm{SO}(n,\mathbb C)$.

The corresponding Lie algebras are

$$\mathfrak{o}(p,q)=\{X\in M_n(\mathbb R)\mid X^{\mathrm T}I_{p,q}+I_{p,q}X=0\},$$
$\mathfrak{o}(n,\mathbb C)=\mathfrak{so}(n,\mathbb C)=\{X\in M_n(\mathbb C)\mid X^{\mathrm T}+X=0\}.$

If

$$g=
\begin{pmatrix}
A&B\\
C&D
\end{pmatrix}$$

with block sizes $p\times p$, $p\times q$, $q\times p$, and $q\times q$, then the defining relation for $\mathrm O(p,q)$ is equivalent to

$$A^{\mathrm T}A-C^{\mathrm T}C=I_p,\qquad
D^{\mathrm T}D-B^{\mathrm T}B=I_q,\qquad
A^{\mathrm T}B=C^{\mathrm T}D.$$

Writing

$$X=
\begin{pmatrix}
P&Q\\
R&S
\end{pmatrix},$$

one obtains the block form

$$\mathfrak{o}(p,q)=
\left\{
\begin{pmatrix}
P&Q\\
Q^{\mathrm T}&S
\end{pmatrix}
\;|\;
P^{\mathrm T}=-P,\ S^{\mathrm T}=-S
\right\}.$$

Thus $\mathfrak{so}(n,\mathbb C)$ is the space of complex skew-symmetric $n\times n$ matrices.

=== Symplectic groups ===
Let $\omega$ be a nondegenerate alternating bilinear form on a vector space of dimension $2n$. Over either $\mathbb R$ or $\mathbb C$, one may choose a basis in which

$$\omega(x,y)=x^{\mathrm T}J_ny,\qquad
J_n=\begin{pmatrix}0&I_n\\-I_n&0\end{pmatrix}.$$

Its automorphism group is the symplectic group

$$\mathrm{Sp}(2n,F)=\{g\in \mathrm{GL}_{2n}(F)\mid g^{\mathrm T}J_ng=J_n\},\qquad F=\mathbb R,\mathbb C.$$

Many authors write $\mathrm{Sp}(n,\mathbb R)$ and $\mathrm{Sp}(n,\mathbb C)$ for these groups.

Its Lie algebra is

$$\mathfrak{sp}(2n,F)=\{X\in M_{2n}(F)\mid X^{\mathrm T}J_n+J_nX=0\}.$$

Equivalently, every element has block form

$$\begin{pmatrix}A&B\\C&-A^{\mathrm T}\end{pmatrix}$$

with $B$ and $C$ symmetric.

== Groups preserving sesquilinear forms ==
=== Unitary groups ===
Let $h$ be a nondegenerate Hermitian form on a complex vector space $V$ of dimension $n$. One may choose a basis in which

$$h(z,w)=z^*I_{p,q}w,\qquad I_{p,q}=\operatorname{diag}(I_p,-I_q),$$

where $p+q=n$.

Its automorphism group is the unitary group

$$\mathrm U(p,q)=\{g\in \mathrm{GL}_n(\mathbb C)\mid g^*I_{p,q}g=I_{p,q}\}.$$

The subgroup of determinant $1$ is the special unitary group

$\mathrm{SU}(p,q)=\mathrm U(p,q)\cap \mathrm{SL}_n(\mathbb C).$

When $q=0$ this is the compact unitary group $\mathrm U(n)$, with determinant-$1$ subgroup $\mathrm{SU}(n)$.

Its Lie algebra is

$\mathfrak{u}(p,q)=\{X\in M_n(\mathbb C)\mid X^*I_{p,q}+I_{p,q}X=0\}.$

If

$$g=
\begin{pmatrix}
A&B\\
C&D
\end{pmatrix},$$

then the defining relation is equivalent to

$$A^*A-C^*C=I_p,\qquad
D^*D-B^*B=I_q,\qquad
A^*B=C^*D.$$

In block form,

$$\mathfrak{u}(p,q)=
\left\{
\begin{pmatrix}
P&Q\\
Q^*&R
\end{pmatrix}
\;|\;
P^*=-P,\ R^*=-R
\right\}.$$

The special unitary Lie algebra is the traceless subalgebra

$$\mathfrak{su}(p,q)=\{X\in \mathfrak{u}(p,q)\mid \operatorname{tr}(X)=0\}.$$

== Quaternionic groups ==
For the quaternionic classical groups, it is convenient to identify

$$\mathbb H=\mathbb C\oplus j\mathbb C$$

and to represent a quaternion $\alpha+j\beta$ by the complex matrix

$$\begin{pmatrix}\alpha&-\overline{\beta}\\[2pt]\beta&\overline{\alpha}\end{pmatrix}.$$

This extends to an embedding

$$M_n(\mathbb H)\hookrightarrow M_{2n}(\mathbb C),\qquad
X+jY\mapsto \begin{pmatrix}X&-\overline{Y}\\Y&\overline{X}\end{pmatrix}.$$

=== GL(n,H) and SL(n,H) ===
The group $\mathrm{GL}(n,\mathbb H)$ consists of the invertible quaternionic-linear endomorphisms of the right vector space $\mathbb H^n$. Via the complex embedding above it is realized as a real Lie subgroup of $\mathrm{GL}(2n,\mathbb C)$ consisting of matrices of the form

$$\begin{pmatrix}
A&-\overline{B}\\
B&\overline{A}
\end{pmatrix},\qquad A,B\in M_n(\mathbb C).$$

Its Lie algebra is therefore

$$\mathfrak{gl}(n,\mathbb H)=
\left\{
\begin{pmatrix}
A&-\overline{B}\\
B&\overline{A}
\end{pmatrix}
\;|\;
A,B\in M_n(\mathbb C)
\right\}.$$

The corresponding real form of $\mathrm{SL}(2n,\mathbb C)$ is denoted $\mathrm{SU}^*(2n)$, and as a Lie group it is isomorphic to the group traditionally written $\mathrm{SL}(n,\mathbb H)$, and is the subgroup of $\mathrm{GL}(n,\mathbb H)$ of elements of reduced norm 1.

Its Lie algebra is

$$\mathfrak{sl}(n,\mathbb H)\cong \mathfrak{su}^*(2n)=
\left\{
\begin{pmatrix}
A&-\overline{B}\\
B&\overline{A}
\end{pmatrix}
\;|\;
\operatorname{Re}\operatorname{tr}(A)=0
\right\}.$$

=== Sp(p,q) ===
Let $V=\mathbb H^{p+q}$ and let

$$B(w,z)=w^*I_{p,q}z,\qquad I_{p,q}=\operatorname{diag}(I_p,-I_q),$$

be a nondegenerate quaternionic Hermitian form. Its isometry group is the quaternionic unitary group

$\mathrm{Sp}(p,q)=\{g\in \mathrm{GL}(p+q,\mathbb H)\mid g^*I_{p,q}g=I_{p,q}\}.$

When $q=0$ this is the compact group usually written $\mathrm{Sp}(n)$.

Viewed as a subgroup of $\mathrm{GL}(2n,\mathbb C)$, the group $\mathrm{Sp}(p,q)$ preserves both a complex Hermitian form of signature $(2p,2q)$ and a nondegenerate complex alternating form. Its Lie algebra is

$\mathfrak{sp}(p,q)=\{X\in M_{p+q}(\mathbb H)\mid X^*I_{p,q}+I_{p,q}X=0\}.$

If

$$g=
\begin{pmatrix}
A&B\\
C&D
\end{pmatrix}$$

with quaternionic blocks, then the defining relation is equivalent to

$$A^*A-C^*C=I_p,\qquad
D^*D-B^*B=I_q,\qquad
A^*B=C^*D.$$

In block form,

$$\mathfrak{sp}(p,q)=
\left\{
\begin{pmatrix}
P&Q\\
Q^*&R
\end{pmatrix}
\;|\;
P^*=-P,\ R^*=-R
\right\}.$$

=== SO^{*}(2n) ===
Let $V=\mathbb H^n$ and consider the quaternionic skew-Hermitian form

$$C(x,y)=x^*jy.$$

Its isometry group is the real Lie group

$$\mathrm{SO}^*(2n),$$

which is a real form of $\mathrm{SO}(2n,\mathbb C)$.

Equivalently, if

$$J_n=\begin{pmatrix}0&I_n\\-I_n&0\end{pmatrix},$$

then $\mathrm{SO}^*(2n)$ may be realized as the subgroup

$$\mathrm{SO}^*(2n)=\{g\in \mathrm{SO}(2n,\mathbb C)\mid \theta(g)=g\},$$

where $\theta(g)=-J_n\overline{g}J_n$ is the involution defining this real form.

Its Lie algebra is denoted $\mathfrak{so}^*(2n)$.

A standard complex realization of $\mathrm{SO}^*(2n)$ is as the subgroup of $\mathrm{GL}(2n,\mathbb C)$ preserving both the symmetric bilinear form with Gram matrix

$$S=
\begin{pmatrix}
0&I_n\\
I_n&0
\end{pmatrix}$$

and the Hermitian form with Gram matrix

$$H=
\begin{pmatrix}
I_n&0\\
0&-I_n
\end{pmatrix}.$$

Equivalently,

$$\mathrm{SO}^*(2n)=
\{g\in \mathrm{GL}(2n,\mathbb C)\mid g^{\mathrm T}Sg=S,\ g^*Hg=H\}.$$

Its Lie algebra is

$$\mathfrak{so}^*(2n)=
\left\{
\begin{pmatrix}
A&B\\
-\overline{B}&\overline{A}
\end{pmatrix}
\;|\;
A^*=-A,\ B^{\mathrm T}=-B
\right\}.$$

== Classical groups over arbitrary fields ==
Over a field $k$, the classical groups are the groups of linear automorphisms of a finite-dimensional vector space that preserve either no additional structure, or a nondegenerate alternating, quadratic, or hermitian form. Over $\mathbb R$ and $\mathbb C$ these recover the familiar classical Lie groups, while over a finite field their groups of rational points give the finite classical groups.

=== Linear groups ===
Let $V$ be an $n$-dimensional vector space over $k$. The general linear group of $V$ is

$$\mathrm{GL}(V)=\operatorname{Aut}_k(V),$$

and the special linear group is

$$\mathrm{SL}(V)=\ker(\det\colon \mathrm{GL}(V)\to k^\times).$$

After a choice of basis these become the matrix groups $\mathrm{GL}_n(k)$ and $\mathrm{SL}_n(k)$. Their projective quotients are the projective general linear group $\mathrm{PGL}(V)$ and the projective special linear group $\mathrm{PSL}(V)$.

=== Groups preserving forms ===
The other classical groups arise as automorphism groups of nondegenerate forms.

If $\omega$ is a nondegenerate alternating bilinear form on $V$, its isometry group is the symplectic group

$$\mathrm{Sp}(V,\omega)=\{g\in \mathrm{GL}(V)\mid \omega(gv,gw)=\omega(v,w)\ \forall v,w\in V\}.$$

For $\dim V=2n$, this is written $\mathrm{Sp}_{2n}(k)$ after a choice of basis.

If $q$ is a nondegenerate quadratic form on $V$, its isometry group is the orthogonal group

$$\mathrm{O}(V,q)=\{g\in \mathrm{GL}(V)\mid q(gv)=q(v)\ \forall v\in V\}.$$

When $\operatorname{char}(k)\neq 2$, this is equivalently the group preserving the associated symmetric bilinear form. In characteristic 2, orthogonal groups are still defined from quadratic forms, but the relation with the associated bilinear form is subtler. For orthogonal groups over general fields, one often also considers the subgroup $\Omega(V,q)$. In the isotropic case and in characteristic not 2, it may be described as the kernel of the spinor norm, a homomorphism from $\mathrm{SO}(V,q)$ (or more generally from the appropriate index-2 subgroup of $\mathrm{O}(V,q)$) to $k^\times/(k^\times)^2$. In the theory of finite classical groups, the simple group is often $\mathrm{P}\Omega(V,q)$ rather than $\mathrm{PSO}(V,q)$.

If $K/k$ is a quadratic field extension, or more generally if $K$ is equipped with an involution $\sigma$, and $h$ is a nondegenerate $\sigma$-hermitian form on a finite-dimensional $K$-vector space $V$, its isometry group is a unitary group

$$\mathrm{U}(V,h)=\{g\in \mathrm{GL}_K(V)\mid h(gv,gw)=h(v,w)\ \forall v,w\in V\}.$$

Its derived subgroup is the special unitary group $\mathrm{SU}(V,h)$.

One also has the corresponding similitude groups $\mathrm{GSp}$, $\mathrm{GO}$, and $\mathrm{GU}$, whose elements preserve the relevant form up to multiplication by a scalar. Projective versions are obtained by quotienting by the center.

=== Classical groups as algebraic groups ===
In the language of algebraic geometry, a linear algebraic group over $k$ is a smooth affine $k$-group scheme, equivalently a smooth closed $k$-subgroup of some $\mathrm{GL}_n$. From this point of view, the connected classical groups are the connected reductive groups of Dynkin types $A_n$, $B_n$, $C_n$, and $D_n$, together with their forms over fields that are not algebraically closed.

The split classical groups are represented by the following standard examples:

- type $A_n$: $\mathrm{SL}_{n+1}$ and $\mathrm{PGL}_{n+1}$;
- type $B_n$: $\mathrm{SO}_{2n+1}$ and its simply connected cover $\mathrm{Spin}_{2n+1}$;
- type $C_n$: $\mathrm{Sp}_{2n}$ and $\mathrm{PSp}_{2n}$;
- type $D_n$: $\mathrm{SO}_{2n}$ and $\mathrm{Spin}_{2n}$.

Over a general field, one obtains additional classical groups as inner or outer forms of these split groups. For example, unitary groups are outer forms of type $A_n$, and many orthogonal or symplectic groups are classified by quadratic or hermitian forms.

When $k=\mathbb F_q$ is a finite field, the groups of $k$-rational points of these algebraic groups yield the finite groups of Lie type. The classical families include groups such as $\mathrm{PSL}_n(q)$, $\mathrm{PSU}_n(q)$, $\mathrm{PSp}_{2n}(q)$, and the finite orthogonal groups.

== Classical groups from central simple algebras with involution ==
The previous section described classical groups attached to vector spaces over a field, together with unitary groups attached to quadratic field extensions. That accounts for the split classical groups and the usual unitary groups, but it does not include the quaternionic families over $\mathbb R$, since $\mathbb H$ is not a split simple algebra. To treat the remaining classical groups, one replaces vector spaces over a field by modules over a central simple algebra with involution. The usual constructions of classical groups in the previous section are recovered when the algebra is a matrix algebra over $k$, or, in the unitary case, over a quadratic field extension of $k$.

Over a finite field, this central simple algebra machinery does not produce additional classical groups beyond the usual matrix groups, because every central simple algebra over a finite field is split. Thus the finite classical groups may be described in the language of algebras with involution, but no genuinely non-split examples arise in that setting.

The complete theory of algebras with involution also uses quadratic pairs in the orthogonal case; that extra formalism is only needed to treat characteristic 2. Henceforth, $k$ is a field of characteristic different from two.

=== Involutions and the three types ===
Let $A$ be a central simple algebra over $k$, and let $\tau\colon A\to A$ be an involution. There are two basic cases.

If $\tau$ acts trivially on the center of $A$, then $\tau$ is said to be of the first kind. In characteristic different from two, involutions of the first kind are divided into two types, depending on whether they become adjoints of symmetric or alternating forms after tensoring $A$ with a separable closure of $k$, respectively:

- orthogonal involutions;
- symplectic involutions.

If the center of $A$ is a quadratic étale $k$-algebra $K$ and $\tau$ induces the nontrivial $k$-automorphism of $K$, then $\tau$ is said to be unitary or of the second kind.

This trichotomy corresponds to the three classical families beyond the general linear group:

- orthogonal type for Dynkin types $B_n$ and $D_n$;
- symplectic type for Dynkin type $C_n$;
- unitary type for outer forms of Dynkin type $A_n$.

=== The groups attached to (A,τ) ===
For any central simple algebra $A$, we write

$$\operatorname{GL}_1(A)=A^\times$$

for the group of invertible elements, and

$$\operatorname{SL}_1(A)=\ker(\operatorname{Nrd}\colon A^\times\to k^\times)$$

for the kernel of the reduced norm. These give the inner forms of type $A$.

If $(A,\tau)$ is of the first kind, then

$$\operatorname{Iso}(A,\tau)=\{a\in A^\times\mid \tau(a)a=1\}$$

is the group of isometries, and

$$\operatorname{Sim}(A,\tau)=\{a\in A^\times\mid \tau(a)a\in k^\times\}$$

is the group of similitudes. The scalar $\mu(a)=\tau(a)a$ is called the multiplier of the similitude. (More generally, one can first define these by their associated group schemes.)

According to the type of $\tau$, we write:

- $\mathrm{O}(A,\tau)=\operatorname{Iso}(A,\tau)$, $\mathrm{GO}(A,\tau)=\operatorname{Sim}(A,\tau)$, and $\mathrm{PGO}(A,\tau)=\operatorname{Aut}(A,\tau)$ in the orthogonal case;
- $\mathrm{Sp}(A,\tau)=\operatorname{Iso}(A,\tau)$, $\mathrm{GSp}(A,\tau)=\operatorname{Sim}(A,\tau)$, and $\mathrm{PGSp}(A,\tau)=\operatorname{Aut}(A,\tau)$ in the symplectic case.

If $(B,\tau)$ is unitary, with center a quadratic étale algebra $K/k$, then

$$\mathrm{U}(B,\tau)=\{b\in B^\times\mid \tau(b)b=1\}$$,
$$\mathrm{GU}(B,\tau)=\{b\in B^\times\mid \tau(b)b\in k^\times\}$$,

and

$$\mathrm{PGU}(B,\tau)=\operatorname{Aut}_K(B,\tau).$$

The kernel of the reduced norm on $\mathrm{U}(B,\tau)$ is denoted

$$\mathrm{SU}(B,\tau)=\ker(\operatorname{Nrd}\colon \mathrm{U}(B,\tau)\to K^\times),$$

and gives the semisimple simply connected group of unitary type.

In the symplectic case, $\mathrm{Sp}(A,\tau)$ is the simply connected group and $\mathrm{PGSp}(A,\tau)$ its adjoint quotient; in the unitary case, $\mathrm{SU}(B,\tau)$ is the simply connected form and $\mathrm{PGU}(B,\tau)$ the corresponding adjoint form.

=== Recovery of the split constructions ===
The field-valued groups discussed earlier are recovered when the algebra is split.

If $A=\operatorname{End}_k(V)$ and $\tau$ is the adjoint involution of a nondegenerate alternating bilinear form $h$ on $V$, then

$$\mathrm{Sp}(A,\tau)=\mathrm{Sp}(V,h)$$,

and one recovers the ordinary symplectic group.

If $A=\operatorname{End}_k(V)$ and $\tau$ is the adjoint involution of a nondegenerate symmetric bilinear form, equivalently of a nondegenerate quadratic form $q$, then

$$\mathrm{O}(A,\tau)=\mathrm{O}(V,q)$$,

and one recovers the ordinary orthogonal group.

If $K/k$ is a quadratic field extension, $B=\operatorname{End}_K(V)$, and $\tau$ is adjoint to a nondegenerate Hermitian form on the $K$-space $V$, then

$$\mathrm{U}(B,\tau)=\mathrm{U}(V,h)$$

and

$$\mathrm{SU}(B,\tau)=\mathrm{SU}(V,h)$$,

so one recovers the usual unitary and special unitary groups.

There is also a split description of the inner forms of type $A$. If the quadratic étale algebra is split,

$$K\cong k\times k,$$

then $B$ is isomorphic to $A\times A^{\mathrm{op}}$ with the exchange involution. In that case

$$\mathrm{U}(B,\tau)\cong \operatorname{GL}_1(A),\qquad
\mathrm{SU}(B,\tau)\cong \operatorname{SL}_1(A),\qquad
\mathrm{PGU}(B,\tau)\cong \mathrm{PGL}_1(A).$$

Thus the same formalism includes both the inner and outer forms of type $A$.

=== Orthogonal type and Clifford algebras ===
On the orthogonal side, the structure of the group is governed by the associated Clifford algebra. For an orthogonal involution $(A,\tau)$, one has a discriminant and a Clifford algebra; in even degree, the center of the even Clifford algebra determines the analogue of the usual $+$-component, and the corresponding simply connected cover is the spin group. In the split case this recovers the ordinary groups

$$\mathrm{PGO}^+(V,q)$$

and

$\mathrm{Spin}(V,q)$.

In the classification of real (and local) classical groups, the orthogonal data require knowing both the algebra $A$ and the involution. (And, if one wants the simply connected groups, the corresponding Clifford algebra.) In characteristic different from $2$, this governs the usual passage from a quadratic form to its even Clifford algebra and spin group.

=== Real forms recovered from the central simple algebra viewpoint ===
Over $\mathbb R$, the algebra-with-involution framework recovers all of the classical real Lie groups. In particular, the quaternionic families arise only after allowing the noncommutative central simple algebra $\mathbb H$.

In the following table, the labels split and quaternionic refer to the underlying central simple algebra, not necessarily to the resulting real algebraic group. Thus split means that the algebra is a full matrix algebra over $\mathbb R$, while quaternionic means that the algebra is a matrix algebra over $\mathbb H$. The labels inner and outer are used only in type $A$: inner means an inner form of the split group of type $A$, arising from a central simple $\mathbb R$-algebra with center $\mathbb R$, whereas outer means a unitary form arising from the quadratic extension $\mathbb C/\mathbb R$.

Dynkin type	Data over $\mathbb R$	Resulting real group
$A_{n-1}$ (inner, split)	$A=M_n(\mathbb R)$	$\mathrm{SL}_n(\mathbb R)$
$A_{2m-1}$ (inner, quaternionic)	$A=M_m(\mathbb H)$	$\mathrm{SL}_m(\mathbb H)\cong \mathrm{SU}^*(2m)$
$A_{n-1}$ (outer if $n\ge 3$)	$K=\mathbb C$ and a Hermitian form of signature $(p,q)$	$\mathrm{SU}(p,q)$ (compact case $\mathrm{SU}(n)=\mathrm{SU}(n,0)$)
$C_n$ (split)	a symplectic involution on $M_{2n}(\mathbb R)$	$\mathrm{Sp}_{2n}(\mathbb R)$
$C_n$ (quaternionic)	a quaternionic Hermitian form of signature $(p,q)$	$\mathrm{Sp}(p,q)$ (compact case $\mathrm{Sp}(n)=\mathrm{Sp}(n,0)$)
$B_n$, $D_n$ (split)	a quadratic form over $\mathbb R$ of signature $(p,q)$	$\mathrm{SO}(p,q)$ and its spin double cover
$D_n$ (quaternionic)	a quaternionic skew-Hermitian form on $\mathbb H^n$	$\mathrm{SO}^*(2n)$ and the corresponding spin group

Combined with the classification of quadratic, Hermitian, and skew-Hermitian forms over $\mathbb R$, this gives the standard list of real forms of the classical groups. In The groups $\mathrm{SL}_m(\mathbb H)\cong \mathrm{SU}^*(2m)$, $\mathrm{Sp}(p,q)$, and $\mathrm{SO}^*(2n)$ are classical groups over the ground field $\mathbb R$ even though they are not defined on ordinary $\mathbb R$-vector spaces alone.

=== Examples over local fields ===
For the real field, for finite extensions of $\mathbb Q_p$, and for several other standard local fields, the only central division algebras admitting involution of the first kind are the field itself and quaternion algebras. Thus over a local field the first classical groups not obtained from ordinary field-valued forms already require the central simple algebra viewpoint, but at least broadly the classification is similar to that over the real field.

Typical examples are:

- if $F$ is a finite extension of $\mathbb Q_p$ and $D$ is the quaternion division algebra over $F$, then $\mathrm{SL}_1(D)$ is the inner form of $\mathrm{SL}_2$, and more generally $\mathrm{SL}_m(D)$ is an inner form of $\mathrm{SL}_{2m}$;
- if $h$ is a nondegenerate Hermitian form on a right $D$-vector space $V$, and $\tau_h$ is the adjoint involution on $\operatorname{End}_D(V)$, then $\mathrm{Sp}(\operatorname{End}_D(V),\tau_h)$ is a classical group of type $C_n$; over $\mathbb R$ with $D=\mathbb H$ this construction gives the groups $\mathrm{Sp}(p,q)$;
- if $s$ is a nondegenerate skew-Hermitian form over $D$, the adjoint involution on $\operatorname{End}_D(V)$ is of orthogonal type, and the associated orthogonal and spin groups are nonsplit forms of types $B_n$ or $D_n$; over $\mathbb R$ with $D=\mathbb H$, the even-dimensional case yields $\mathrm{SO}^*(2n)$.
