= Radical of an algebraic group =

The radical of an algebraic group is the identity component of its maximal normal solvable subgroup. For example, the radical of the general linear group $\operatorname{GL}_n(K)$ (for a field K) is the subgroup consisting of scalar matrices, i.e. matrices $(a_{ij})$ with $a_{11} = \dots = a_{nn}$ and $a_{ij}=0$ for $i \ne j$.

An algebraic group is called semisimple if its radical is trivial, i.e., consists of the identity element only. The group $\operatorname{SL}_n(K)$ is semi-simple, for example.

The subgroup of unipotent elements in the radical is called the unipotent radical, it serves to define reductive groups.

== See also ==
- Reductive group
- Unipotent group
