= Paramodular group =

In mathematics, a paramodular group is a special sort of arithmetic subgroup of the symplectic group. It is a generalization of the Siegel modular group, and has the same relation to polarized abelian varieties that the Siegel modular group has to principally polarized abelian varieties. It is the group of automorphisms of Z^{2n} preserving a non-degenerate skew-symmetric form. The name "paramodular group" is often used to mean one of several standard matrix representations of this group. The corresponding group over the reals is called the parasymplectic group and is conjugate to a (real) symplectic group. A paramodular form is a Siegel modular form for a paramodular group.

Paramodular groups were introduced by Conforto (1952) and named by Shimura (1958, section 8).

== Explicit matrices for the paramodular group ==
There are two conventions for writing the paramodular group as matrices. In the first (older) convention, the matrix entries are integers but the group is not a subgroup of the symplectic group, while in the second convention the paramodular group is a subgroup of the usual symplectic group (over the rationals) but its coordinates are not always integers. These two forms of the symplectic group are conjugate in the general linear group.

Any nonsingular skew-symmetric form on Z^{2n} is equivalent to one given by a matrix

$$\begin{pmatrix} 0&F\\-F&0\end{pmatrix}$$

where F is an n-by-n diagonal matrix whose diagonal elements F_{ii} are positive integers with each dividing the next. So any paramodular group is conjugate to one preserving the form above, in other words it consists of the matrices

$$\begin{pmatrix} A&B\\C&D\end{pmatrix}$$

of GL_{2n} Z such that

$$\begin{pmatrix} A&B\\C&D\end{pmatrix}^t\begin{pmatrix} 0&F\\-F&0\end{pmatrix}\begin{pmatrix} A&B\\C&D\end{pmatrix} = \begin{pmatrix} 0&F\\-F&0\end{pmatrix}.$$

The conjugate of the paramodular group by the matrix

$$\begin{pmatrix} I&0\\0&F\end{pmatrix}$$

(where I is the identity matrix) lies in the symplectic group Sp_{2n} Q, since

$$\begin{pmatrix} I&0\\0&F\end{pmatrix}^t\begin{pmatrix} 0&I\\-I&0\end{pmatrix}\begin{pmatrix} I&0\\0&F\end{pmatrix} = \begin{pmatrix} 0&F\\-F&0\end{pmatrix}$$

though its entries are not in general integers. This conjugate is also often called the paramodular group.

== The paramodular group of degree 2 ==
Paramodular group of degree n=2 are subgroups of GL_{4} Q so can be represented as 4-by-4 matrices. There are at least 3 ways of doing this used in the literature. This section describes how to represent it as a subgroup of Sp_{4} Q with entries that are not necessarily integers.

Any non-degenerate skew-symmetric form on Z^{4} is up to isomorphism and scalar multiples equivalent to one given as above by the matrix

$$F=\begin{pmatrix} 1&0\\0&N\end{pmatrix}$$.

In this case one form of the paramodular group consists of the symplectic matrices of the form

$$\begin{pmatrix} *&*&*&*/N\\ {}*&*&*&*/N\\ {}*&*&*&*/N\\ N*&N*&N*&*\end{pmatrix}$$

where each $*$ stands for an integer. The fact that this matrix is symplectic forces some further congruence conditions, so in fact the paramodular group consists of the symplectic matrices of the form

$$\begin{pmatrix} *&N*&*&*\\ {}*&*&*&*/N\\ {}*&N*&*&*\\ N*&N*&N*&*\end{pmatrix}$$

The paramodular group in this case is generated by matrices of the forms

$$\begin{pmatrix} 1&0&0&0\\ {}0&1&0&0\\ {}x&Ny&1&0\\ Ny&Nz&0&1\end{pmatrix}$$
and
$$\begin{pmatrix} 1&0&x&y\\ {}0&1&y&z/N\\ {}0&0&1&0\\ 0&0&0&1\end{pmatrix}$$

for integers x, y, and z.

Some authors use the matrix
$$F=\begin{pmatrix} N&0\\0&1\end{pmatrix}$$
instead of
$$\begin{pmatrix} 1&0\\0&N\end{pmatrix}$$
which gives similar results except that the rows and columns get permuted; for example, the paramodular group then consists of the symplectic matrices of the form

$$\begin{pmatrix} *&*&*/N&*\\ {}N*&*&*&*\\ {}N*&N*&*&N*\\ N*&*&*&*\end{pmatrix}$$
