= Siegel operator =

In mathematics, the Siegel operator is a linear map from (level 1) Siegel modular forms of degree d to Siegel modular forms of degree d − 1, generalizing taking the constant term of a modular form. The kernel is the space of Siegel cusp forms of degree d.
