= The Classical Groups =

1939 mathematics book by Hermann Weyl

- Author: Hermann Weyl
- Publication date: 1939
- ISBN: 9780691057569

In Weyl's wonderful and terrible^{1} book The Classical Groups [W] one may discern two main themes: first, the study of the polynomial invariants for an arbitrary number of (contravariant or covariant) variables for a standard classical group action; second, the isotypic decomposition of the full tensor algebra for such an action.

^{1}Most people who know the book feel the material in it is wonderful. Many also feel the presentation is terrible. (The author is not among these latter.)

— Howe (1989, p.539)

The Classical Groups: Their Invariants and Representations is a mathematics book by Hermann Weyl published in 1939. The book describes classical invariant theory in terms of representation theory. It is largely responsible for the revival of interest in invariant theory, which had been almost killed off by David Hilbert's solution of its main problems in the 1890s.

The second edition was published in 1946. Weyl gave an informal talk about the topic of his book in 1939.

== Reception ==
Roger Howe called the book "wonderful and terrible".
