= Steinberg representation =

Linear representation in mathematics

In mathematics, the Steinberg representation, or Steinberg module or Steinberg character, denoted by St, is a particular linear representation of a reductive algebraic group over a finite field or local field, or a group with a BN-pair. It is analogous to the 1-dimensional sign representation ε of a Coxeter or Weyl group that takes all reflections to –1.

For groups over finite fields, these representations were introduced by Robert Steinberg (1951, 1956, 1957), first for the general linear groups, then for classical groups, and then for all Chevalley groups, with a construction that immediately generalized to the other groups of Lie type that were discovered soon after by Steinberg, Suzuki and Ree. Over a finite field of characteristic p, the Steinberg representation has degree equal to the largest power of p dividing the order of the group.

The Steinberg representation is the Alvis–Curtis dual of the trivial 1-dimensional representation.

Matsumoto (1969), Shalika (1970), and Harish-Chandra (1973) defined analogous Steinberg representations (sometimes called special representations) for algebraic groups over local fields. For the general linear group GL(2), the dimension of the Jacquet module of a special representation is always one.

== The Steinberg representation of a finite group ==
- The character value of St on an element g equals, up to sign, the order of a Sylow subgroup of the centralizer of g if g has order prime to p, and is zero if the order of g is divisible by p.
- The Steinberg representation is equal to an alternating sum over all parabolic subgroups containing a Borel subgroup, of the representation induced from the identity representation of the parabolic subgroup.
- The Steinberg representation is both regular and unipotent, and is the only irreducible regular unipotent representation (for the given prime p).
- The Steinberg representation is used in the proof of Haboush's theorem (the Mumford conjecture).

Most finite simple groups have exactly one Steinberg representation. A few have more than one because they are groups of Lie type in more than one way. For symmetric groups (and other Coxeter groups) the sign representation is analogous to the Steinberg representation. Some of the sporadic simple groups act as doubly transitive permutation groups so have a BN-pair for which one can define a Steinberg representation, but for most of the sporadic groups there is no known analogue of it.

== The Steinberg representation of a p-adic group ==
Matsumoto (1969), Shalika (1970), and Harish-Chandra (1973) introduced Steinberg representations for algebraic groups over local fields. Casselman (1973) showed that the different ways of defining Steinberg representations are equivalent. Borel & Serre (1976) and Borel (1976) showed how to realize the Steinberg representation in the cohomology group H^{l}_{c}(X) of the Bruhat–Tits building of the group.
