= Deligne–Lusztig theory =

Technique in mathematical group theory

In mathematics, Deligne–Lusztig theory is a way of constructing linear representations of finite groups of Lie type using ℓ-adic cohomology (Étale cohomology) with compact support, introduced by Pierre Deligne and George Lusztig (1976).

Lusztig (1985) used these representations to find all representations of all finite simple groups of Lie type.

== Motivation ==
Suppose that G is a reductive group defined over a finite field, with Frobenius map F.

Ian G. Macdonald conjectured that there should be a map from general position characters of F-stable maximal tori to irreducible representations of $G^F$ (the fixed points of F). For general linear groups this was already known by the work of J. A. Green (1955). This was the main result proved by Pierre Deligne and George Lusztig; they found a virtual representation for all characters of an F-stable maximal torus, which is irreducible (up to sign) when the character is in general position.

When the maximal torus is split, these representations were well known and are given by parabolic induction of characters of the torus (extend the character to a Borel subgroup, then induce it up to G). The representations of parabolic induction can be constructed using functions on a space, which can be thought of as elements of a suitable zeroth cohomology group. Deligne and Lusztig's construction is a generalization of parabolic induction to non-split tori using higher cohomology groups. (Parabolic induction can also be done with tori of G replaced by Levi subgroups of G, and there is a generalization of Deligne–Lusztig theory to this case too.)

Vladimir Drinfeld proved that the discrete series representations of SL_{2}(F_{q}) can be found in the ℓ-adic cohomology groups

$$H^1_c(X, \Q_{\ell})$$

of the affine curve X defined by

$$xy^q-yx^q = 1$$.

The polynomial $xy^q-yx^q$ is a determinant used in the construction of the Dickson invariant of the general linear group, and is an invariant of the special linear group.

The construction of Deligne and Lusztig is a generalization of this fundamental example to other groups. The affine curve X is generalized to a $T^F$ bundle over a "Deligne–Lusztig variety" where T is a maximal torus of G, and instead of using just the first cohomology group they use an alternating sum of ℓ-adic cohomology groups with compact support to construct virtual representations.

The Deligne-Lusztig construction is formally similar to Hermann Weyl's construction of the representations of a compact group from the characters of a maximal torus. The case of compact groups is easier partly because there is only one conjugacy class of maximal tori. The Borel–Weil–Bott construction of representations of algebraic groups using coherent sheaf cohomology is also similar.

For real semisimple groups there is an analogue of the construction of Deligne and Lusztig, using Zuckerman functors to construct representations.

== Deligne–Lusztig varieties ==
The construction of Deligne-Lusztig characters uses a family of auxiliary algebraic varieties X_{T} called Deligne–Lusztig varieties, constructed from a reductive linear algebraic group G defined over a finite field F_{q}.

If B is a Borel subgroup of G and T a maximal torus of B then we write

W_{T,B}

for the Weyl group (normalizer mod centralizer)

N_{G}(T)/T

of G with respect to T, together with the simple roots corresponding to B. If B_{1} is another Borel subgroup with maximal torus T_{1} then there is a canonical isomorphism from T to T_{1} that identifies the two Weyl groups. So we can identify all these Weyl groups, and call it 'the' Weyl group W of G. Similarly there is a canonical isomorphism between any two maximal tori with given choice of positive roots, so we can identify all these and call it 'the' maximal torus T of G.

By the Bruhat decomposition

G = BWB,

the subgroup B_{1} can be written as the conjugate of B by bw for some b∈B and w∈W (identified with W_{T,B}) where w is uniquely determined. In this case we say that B and B_{1} are in relative position w.

Suppose that w is in the Weyl group of G, and write X for the smooth projective variety of all Borel subgroups of G. The Deligne-Lusztig variety X(w) consists of all Borel subgroups B of G such that B and F(B) are in relative position w [recall that F is the Frobenius map]. In other words, it is the inverse image of the G-homogeneous space of pairs of Borel subgroups in relative position w, under the Lang isogeny with formula

g.F(g)^{−1}.

For example, if w=1 then X(w) is 0-dimensional and its points are the rational Borel subgroups of G.

We let T(w) be the torus T, with the rational structure for which the Frobenius is wF. The G^{F} conjugacy classes of F-stable maximal tori of G can be identified with the F-conjugacy classes of W, where we say w∈W is F-conjugate to elements of the form vwF(v)^{−1} for v∈W. If the group G is split, so that F acts trivially on W, this is the same as ordinary conjugacy, but in general for non-split groups G, F may act on W via a non-trivial diagram automorphism. The F-stable conjugacy classes can be identified with elements of the non-abelian Galois cohomology group of torsors

$$H^1(F,W)$$.

Fix a maximal torus T of G and a Borel subgroup B containing it, both invariant under the Frobenius map F, and write U for the unipotent radical of B. If we choose a representative w′ of the normalizer N(T) representing w, then we define X′(w′) to be the elements of G/U with F(u)=uw′. This is acted on freely by T(F), and the quotient is isomorphic to X(T). So for each character θ of T(w)^{F} we get a corresponding local system F_{θ} on X(w). The Deligne-Lusztig virtual representation

R^{θ}(w)

of G^{F} is defined by the alternating sum

$$R^\theta(w) = \sum_i(-1)^iH_c^i(X(w),F_\theta)$$

of l-adic compactly supported cohomology groups of X(w) with coefficients in the l-adic local system F_{θ}.

If T is a maximal F-invariant torus of G contained in a Borel subgroup B such that B and FB are in relative position w then R^{θ}(w) is also denoted by R^{θ}_{T⊂B}, or by R^{θ}_{T} as up to isomorphism it does not depend on the choice of B.

== Properties of Deligne–Lusztig characters ==
- The character of R^{θ}_{T} does not depend on the choice of prime l≠p, and if θ=1 its values are rational integers.
- Every irreducible character of G^{F} occurs in at least one character R^{θ}(w).
- The inner product of R^{θ}_{T} and R^{θ′}_{T′} is equal to the number of elements of W(T,T′)^{F} taking θ to θ′. The set W(T,T′) is the set of elements of G taking T to T′ under conjugation, modulo the group T^{F} which acts on it in the obvious way (so if T=T′ it is the Weyl group). In particular the inner product is 0 if w and w′ are not F-conjugate. If θ is in general position then R^{θ}_{T} has norm 1 and is therefore an irreducible character up to sign. So this verifies Macdonald's conjecture.
- The representation R^{θ}_{T} contains the trivial representation if and only if θ=1 (in which case the trivial representation occurs exactly once).
- The representation R^{θ}_{T} has dimension

$$\dim(R^\theta_{T})= {\pm|G^F| \over |T^F||U^F|}$$
where U^{F} is a Sylow p-subgroup of G^{F}, of order the largest power of p dividing |G^{F}|.

- The restriction of the character R^{θ}_{T} to unipotent elements u does not depend on θ and is called a Green function, denoted by Q_{T,G}(u) (the Green function is defined to be 0 on elements that are not unipotent). The character formula gives the character of R^{θ}_{T} in terms of Green functions of subgroups as follows:

$$R^\theta_T(x) = {1\over |G_s^F|}\sum_{g\in G^F, g^{-1}sg\in T} Q_{gTg^{-1},G_s}(u)\theta(g^{-1}sg)$$
where x=su is the Jordan–Chevalley decomposition of x as the product of commuting semisimple and unipotent elements s and u, and G_{s} is the identity component of the centralizer of s in G. In particular the character value vanishes unless the semisimple part of x is conjugate under G^{F} to something in the torus T.

- The Deligne-Lusztig variety is usually affine, in particular whenever the characteristic p is larger than the Coxeter number h of the Weyl group. If it is affine and the character θ is in general position (so that the Deligne-Lusztig character is irreducible up to sign) then only one of the cohomology groups H^{i}(X(w),F_{θ}) is non-zero (the one with i equal to the length of w) so this cohomology group gives a model for the irreducible representation. In general it is possible for more than one cohomology group to be non-zero, for example when θ is 1.

== Lusztig's classification of irreducible characters ==
Lusztig classified all the irreducible characters of G^{F} by decomposing such a character into a semisimple character and a unipotent character (of another group) and separately classifying the semisimple and unipotent characters.

=== The dual group ===
The representations of G^{F} are classified using conjugacy classes of the dual group of G. A reductive group over a finite field determines a root datum (with choice of Weyl chamber) together with an action of the Frobenius element on it. The dual group G^{*} of a reductive algebraic group G defined over a finite field is the one with dual root datum (and adjoint Frobenius action). This is similar to the Langlands dual group (or L-group), except here the dual group is defined over a finite field rather than over the complex numbers. The dual group has the same root system, except that root systems of type B and C get exchanged.

The local Langlands conjectures state (very roughly) that representations of an algebraic group over a local field should be closely related to conjugacy classes in the Langlands dual group. Lusztig's classification of representations of reductive groups over finite fields can be thought of as a verification of an analogue of this conjecture for finite fields (though Langlands never stated his conjecture for this case).

=== Jordan decomposition ===
In this section G will be a reductive group with connected center.

An irreducible character is called unipotent if it occurs in some R^{1}_{T}, and is called semisimple if its average value on regular unipotent elements is non-zero (in which case the average value is 1 or −1). If p is a good prime for G (meaning that it does not divide any of the coefficients of roots expressed as linear combinations of simple roots) then an irreducible character is semisimple if and only if its order is not divisible by p.

An arbitrary irreducible character has a "Jordan decomposition": to it one can associate a semisimple character (corresponding to some semisimple element s of the dual group), and a unipotent representation of the centralizer of s. The dimension of the irreducible character is the product of the dimensions of its semisimple and unipotent components.

This (more or less) reduces the classification of irreducible characters to the problem of finding the semisimple and the unipotent characters.

=== Geometric conjugacy ===
Two pairs (T,θ), (T′,θ′) of a maximal torus T of G fixed by F and a character θ of T^{F} are called geometrically conjugate if they are conjugate under some element of G(k), where k is the algebraic closure of F_{q}. If an irreducible representation occurs in both R_{T}^{θ} and R_{T′}^{θ′} then (T,θ), (T′,θ′) need not be conjugate under G^{F}, but are always geometrically conjugate. For example, if θ = θ′ = 1 and T and T′ are not conjugate, then the identity representation occurs in both Deligne–Lusztig characters, and the corresponding pairs (T,1), (T′,1) are geometrically conjugate but not conjugate.

The geometric conjugacy classes of pairs (T,θ) are parameterized by geometric conjugacy classes of semisimple elements s of the group G^{*F} of elements of the dual group G^{*} fixed by F. Two elements of G^{*F} are called geometrically conjugate if they are conjugate over the algebraic closure of the finite field; if the center of G is connected this is equivalent to conjugacy in G^{*F}. The number of geometric conjugacy classes of pairs (T,θ) is |Z^{0F}|q^{l} where Z^{0} is the identity component of the center Z of G and l is the semisimple rank of G.

=== Classification of semisimple characters ===
In this subsection G will be a reductive group with connected center Z. (The case when the center is not connected has some extra complications.)

The semisimple characters of G correspond to geometric conjugacy classes of pairs (T,θ) (where T is a maximal torus invariant under F and θ is a character of T^{F}); in fact among the irreducible characters occurring in the Deligne–Lusztig characters of a geometric conjugacy class there is exactly one semisimple character. If the center of G is connected there are |Z^{F}|q^{l} semisimple characters. If κ is a geometric conjugacy class of pairs (T,θ) then the character of the corresponding semisimple representation is given up to sign by

$$\sum_{(T,\theta)\in \kappa, \bmod G^F} {R_T^\theta\over (R_T^\theta,R_T^\theta)}$$

and its dimension is the p′ part of the index of the centralizer of the element s of the dual group corresponding to it.

The semisimple characters are (up to sign) exactly the duals of the regular characters, under Alvis–Curtis duality, a duality operation on generalized characters. An irreducible character is called regular if it occurs in the Gelfand–Graev representation G^{F}, which is the representation induced from a certain "non-degenerate" 1-dimensional character of the Sylow p-subgroup. It is reducible, and any irreducible character of G^{F} occurs at most once in it. If κ is a geometric conjugacy class of pairs (T,θ) then the character of the corresponding regular representation is given by

$$\sum_{(T,\theta)\in \kappa, \bmod G^F} {\epsilon_G\epsilon_TR_T^\theta\over (R_T^\theta,R_T^\theta)}$$

and its dimension is the p′ part of the index of the centralizer of the element s of the dual group corresponding to it times the p-part of the order of the centralizer.

=== Classification of unipotent characters ===
These can be found from the cuspidal unipotent characters: those that cannot be obtained from decomposition of parabolically induced characters of smaller rank groups. The unipotent cuspidal characters were listed by Lusztig using rather complicated arguments. The number of them depends only on the type of the group and not on the underlying field; and is given as follows:

- none for groups of type A_{n};
- none for groups of type ^{2}A_{n}, unless n = s(s+1)/2–1 for some s, in which case there is one;
- none for groups of type B_{n} or C_{n}, unless n = s(s+1) for some s, in which case there is one (called θ_{10} when n = 2);
- 2 for Suzuki groups of type ^{2}B_{2};
- none for groups of type D_{n}, unless n = s^{2} for some even s, in which case there is one;
- none for groups of type ^{2}D_{n}, unless n = s^{2} for some odd s, in which case there is one;
- 2 for groups of type ^{3}D_{4};
- 2 for groups of type E_{6};
- 3 for groups of type ^{2}E_{6};
- 2 for groups of type E_{7};
- 13 for groups of type E_{8};
- 7 for groups of type F_{4};
- 10 for Ree groups of type ^{2}F_{4};
- 4 for groups of type G_{2};
- 6 for Ree groups of type ^{2}G_{2}.

The unipotent characters can be found by decomposing the characters induced from the cuspidal ones, using Hecke algebras with unequal parameters. The number of unipotent characters depends only on the root system of the group and not on the field (or the center). The dimension of the unipotent characters can be given by universal polynomials in the order of the ground field depending only on the root system; for example the Steinberg representation has dimension q^{r}, where r is the number of positive roots of the root system.

Lusztig discovered that the unipotent characters of a group G^{F} (with irreducible Weyl group) fall into families of size 4^{n} (n ≥ 0), 8, 21, or 39. The characters of each family are indexed by conjugacy classes of pairs (x,σ) where x is in one of the groups Z/2Z^{n}, S_{3}, S_{4}, S_{5} respectively, and σ is a representation of its centralizer. (The family of size 39 only occurs for groups of type E_{8}, and the family of size 21 only occurs for groups of type F_{4}.) The families are in turn indexed by special representations of the Weyl group, or equivalently by 2-sided cells of the Weyl group. For example, the group E_{8}(F_{q}) has 46 families of unipotent characters corresponding to the 46 special representations of the Weyl group of E_{8}. There are 23 families with 1 character, 18 families with 4 characters, 4 families with 8 characters, and one family with 39 characters (which includes the 13 cuspidal unipotent characters).

== Examples ==
Suppose that q is an odd prime power, and G is the algebraic group SL_{2}. We describe the Deligne–Lusztig representations of the group SL_{2}(F_{q}). (The representation theory of these groups was well known long before Deligne–Lusztig theory.)

The irreducible representations are:

- The trivial representation of dimension 1.
- The Steinberg representation of dimension q
- The (q − 3)/2 irreducible principal series representations of dimension q + 1, together with 2 representations of dimension (q + 1)/2 coming from a reducible principal series representation.
- The (q − 1)/2 irreducible discrete series representations of dimension q − 1, together with 2 representations of dimension (q − 1)/2 coming from a reducible discrete series representation.

There are two classes of tori associated to the two elements (or conjugacy classes) of the Weyl group, denoted by T(1) (cyclic of order q−1) and T(w) (cyclic of order q + 1). The non-trivial element of the Weyl group acts on the characters of these tori by changing each character to its inverse. So the Weyl group fixes a character if and only if it has order 1 or 2. By the orthogonality formula, R^{θ}(w) is (up to sign) irreducible if θ does not have order 1 or 2, and a sum of two irreducible representations if it has order 1 or 2.

The Deligne-Lusztig variety X(1) for the split torus is 0-dimensional with q+1 points, and can be identified with the points of 1-dimensional projective space defined over F_{q}. The representations R^{θ}(1) are given as follows:

- 1+Steinberg if θ=1
- The sum of the 2 representations of dimension (q+1)/2 if θ has order 2.
- An irreducible principal series representation if θ has order greater than 2.

The Deligne-Lusztig variety X(w) for the non-split torus is 1-dimensional, and can be identified with the complement of X(1) in 1-dimensional projective space. So it is the set of points (x:y) of projective space not fixed by the Frobenius map (x:y)→ (x^{q}:y^{q}), in other words the points with

$$xy^q-yx^q\ne 0$$

Drinfeld's variety of points (x,y) of affine space with

$$xy^q-yx^q=1$$

maps to X(w) in the obvious way, and is acted on freely by the group of q+1th roots λ of 1 (which can be identified with the elements of the non-split torus that are defined over F_{q}), with λ taking (x,y) to (λx,λy). The Deligne Lusztig variety is the quotient of Drinfeld's variety by this group action. The representations −R^{θ}(w) are given as follows:

- Steinberg−1 if θ=1
- The sum of the 2 representations of dimension (q−1)/2 if θ has order 2.
- An irreducible discrete series representation if θ has order greater than 2.

The unipotent representations are the trivial representation and the Steinberg representation, and the semisimple representations are all the representations other than the Steinberg representation. (In this case the semisimple representations do not correspond exactly to geometric conjugacy classes of the dual group, as the center of G is not connected.)

== Intersection cohomology and character sheaves ==
Lusztig (1985) replaced the ℓ-adic cohomology used to define the Deligne-Lusztig representations with intersection ℓ-adic cohomology, and introduced certain perverse sheaves called character sheaves. The representations defined using intersection cohomology are related to those defined using ordinary cohomology by Kazhdan–Lusztig polynomials. The F-invariant irreducible character sheaves are closely related to the irreducible characters of the group G^{F}.
