= Gelfand–Graev representation =

In representation theory, a branch of mathematics, the Gelfand–Graev representation is a representation of a reductive group over a finite field introduced by Gelfand & Graev (1962), induced from a non-degenerate character of a Sylow subgroup.

The Gelfand–Graev representation is reducible and decomposes as the sum of irreducible representations, each of multiplicity at most 1. The irreducible representations occurring in the Gelfand–Graev representation are called regular representations. These are the analogues for finite groups of representations with a Whittaker model.
