= Parabolic induction =

In mathematics, parabolic induction is a method of constructing representations of a reductive group from representations of its parabolic subgroups.

If G is a reductive algebraic group and $P=MAN$ is the Langlands decomposition of a parabolic subgroup P, then parabolic induction consists of taking a representation of $MA$, extending it to P by letting N act trivially, and inducing the result from P to G.

There are some generalizations of parabolic induction using cohomology, such as cohomological parabolic induction and Deligne–Lusztig theory.

== Philosophy of cusp forms ==
The philosophy of cusp forms was a slogan of Harish-Chandra, expressing his idea of a kind of reverse engineering of automorphic form theory, from the point of view of representation theory. The discrete group Γ fundamental to the classical theory disappears, superficially. What remains is the basic idea that representations in general are to be constructed by parabolic induction of cuspidal representations. A similar philosophy was enunciated by Israel Gelfand, and the philosophy is a precursor of the Langlands program. A consequence for thinking about representation theory is that cuspidal representations are the fundamental class of objects, from which other representations may be constructed by procedures of induction.

According to Nolan Wallach

Put in the simplest terms the "philosophy of cusp forms" says that for each Γ-conjugacy classes of Q-rational parabolic subgroups one should construct automorphic functions (from objects from spaces of lower dimensions) whose constant terms are zero for other conjugacy classes and the constant terms for [an] element of the given class give all constant terms for this parabolic subgroup. This is almost possible and leads to a description of all automorphic forms in terms of these constructs and cusp forms. The construction that does this is the Eisenstein series.
