= Symplectic group =

Mathematical group

In mathematics, the symplectic group is the group of linear transformations that preserve the geometric structure of phase space, the space of position and momentum variables used in classical mechanics. It is defined as the group of linear changes of coordinates on phase space that preserve the symplectic form.

The symplectic groups are usually denoted $\operatorname{Sp}(2n,\mathbb{F})$, where $n$ is a positive integer and $\mathbb{F}$ is a field, often the real numbers or complex numbers. They are among the four families of classical groups and play a central role in symplectic geometry, Hamiltonian mechanics, and representation theory. A related but different family is the compact symplectic group, usually denoted $\operatorname{Sp}(n)$ or $\mathrm{USp}(n)$.

== Terminology and notation ==
The name "symplectic" was introduced by Hermann Weyl as a replacement for older terminology such as line complex group. It was intended as a Greek-based analogue of the word "complex".

The notation $\operatorname{Sp}(2n,\mathbb{F})$ usually denotes the symplectic group of a $2n$-dimensional symplectic vector space over a field $\mathbb{F}$. A related but different family is the compact symplectic group, denoted $\operatorname{Sp}(n)$ or $\mathrm{USp}(n)$, which is the compact real form of the complex symplectic group.

Many authors use slightly different notations, often differing by factors of $2$. In Cartan's classification, the Lie algebra of $\operatorname{Sp}(2n,\mathbb{C})$ has type $C_n$.

== Sp(2n, F) ==
The symplectic group is a classical group defined as the set of linear transformations of a $2n$-dimensional vector space over the field $\mathbb{F}$ which preserve a non-degenerate skew-symmetric bilinear form. Such a vector space is called a symplectic vector space, and the symplectic group of an abstract symplectic vector space $V$ is denoted $\operatorname{Sp}(V)$. Upon fixing a basis for $V$, the symplectic form is represented by a nonsingular skew-symmetric matrix $J$, and $\operatorname{Sp}(V)$ is identified with the group of $2n\times 2n$ matrices over $\mathbb{F}$ satisfying

$$\{M \in M_{2n\times 2n}(\mathbb{F}) : M^\mathrm{T} J M = J\}.$$

This matrix group is denoted $\operatorname{Sp}(2n,\mathbb{F})$ or $\operatorname{Sp}(n,\mathbb{F})$, although the notation depends on the convention being used. Here $M^T$ denotes the transpose of $M$.

In an arbitrary basis, the matrix $J$ need not have any particular form. However, one can choose a symplectic basis, in which the form is represented by the standard matrix

$$\Omega = \begin{pmatrix} 0 & I_n \\ -I_n & 0 \end{pmatrix},$$

where $I_n$ is the identity matrix. In such a basis,

$$\operatorname{Sp}(2n,\mathbb{F})=\{M\in M_{2n\times 2n}(\mathbb{F}):M^\mathrm{T}\Omega M=\Omega\}.$$

In this case, $\operatorname{Sp}(2n,\mathbb{F})$ can be expressed as those block matrices $(\begin{smallmatrix} A & B \\ C & D \end{smallmatrix})$, where $A, B, C, D \in M_{n \times n}(\mathbb{F})$, satisfying the three equations:

$$\begin{align}
-C^\mathrm{T}A + A^\mathrm{T}C &= 0, \\
-C^\mathrm{T}B + A^\mathrm{T}D &= I_n, \\
-D^\mathrm{T}B + B^\mathrm{T}D &= 0.
\end{align}$$

Since all symplectic matrices have determinant $1$, the symplectic group is a subgroup of the special linear group $\operatorname{SL}(2n,\mathbb{F})$. When $n=1$, the symplectic condition on a matrix is satisfied if and only if the determinant is one, so that $\operatorname{Sp}(2,\mathbb{F})=\operatorname{SL}(2,\mathbb{F})$. For $n>1$, there are additional conditions, i.e. $\operatorname{Sp}(2n,\mathbb{F})$ is then a proper subgroup of $\operatorname{SL}(2n,\mathbb{F})$.

Typically, the field $\mathbb{F}$ is the field of real numbers $\mathbb{R}$ or complex numbers $\mathbb{C}$. In these cases $\operatorname{Sp}(2n,\mathbb{F})$ is a real or complex Lie group of real or complex dimension $n(2n+1)$, respectively. These groups are connected but non-compact.

The center of $\operatorname{Sp}(2n,\mathbb{F})$ consists of the matrices $I_{2n}$ and $-I_{2n}$ as long as the characteristic of the field is not $2$. Since the center of $\operatorname{Sp}(2n,\mathbb{F})$ is discrete and its quotient modulo the center is a simple group, $\operatorname{Sp}(2n,\mathbb{F})$ is considered a simple Lie group.

The real rank of the corresponding Lie algebra, and hence of the Lie group $\operatorname{Sp}(2n,\mathbb{F})$, is $n$.

The Lie algebra of $\operatorname{Sp}(2n,\mathbb{F})$ is the set

$$\mathfrak{sp}(2n,F) = \{X \in M_{2n \times 2n}(F) : \Omega X + X^\mathrm{T} \Omega = 0\},$$

equipped with the commutator as its Lie bracket. For the standard skew-symmetric bilinear form $\Omega = (\begin{smallmatrix} 0 & I \\ -I & 0 \end{smallmatrix})$, this Lie algebra is the set of all block matrices $(\begin{smallmatrix} A & B \\ C & D \end{smallmatrix})$ subject to the conditions

$$\begin{align}
A &= -D^\mathrm{T}, \\
B &= B^\mathrm{T}, \\
C &= C^\mathrm{T}.
\end{align}$$

=== Sp(2n, C) ===
The symplectic group over the field of complex numbers is a non-compact, simply connected, simple Lie group. The definition of this group includes no conjugates (contrary to what one might naively expect) but instead it is exactly the same as the definition bar the field change.

=== Sp(2n, R) ===
$\operatorname{Sp}(2n,\mathbb{R})$ is a real, non-compact, connected simple Lie group of dimension $n(2n+1)$. It has fundamental group isomorphic to the integers under addition. As the real form of a simple complex Lie algebra, its Lie algebra is the split real form of $\mathfrak{sp}(2n,\mathbb{C})$.

The exponential map from $\mathfrak{sp}(2n,\mathbb{R})$ to $\operatorname{Sp}(2n,\mathbb{R})$ is not surjective.

For every $S$ in $\operatorname{Sp}(2n,\mathbb{R})$, one has a Cartan/polar decomposition
$$S = OZO'$$
with $O,O' \in \operatorname{Sp}(2n,\mathbb{R})\cap\operatorname{SO}(2n)\cong\operatorname{U}(n)$ and
$$Z=\begin{pmatrix}D&0\\0&D^{-1}\end{pmatrix}$$
. As a manifold, $\operatorname{Sp}(2n,\mathbb{R})$ is diffeomorphic to $\operatorname{U}(n)$ times a vector space of dimension $n(n+1)$.

=== Generators ===
==== Infinitesimal generators ====
The members of the symplectic Lie algebra $\mathfrak{sp}(2n,\mathbb{F})$ are the Hamiltonian matrices.

These are matrices, $Q$ such that
$$Q = \begin{pmatrix} A & B \\ C & -A^\mathrm{T} \end{pmatrix}$$
where $B$ and $C$ are symmetric matrices. See classical group for a derivation.

==== Generation by transvections ====
The symplectic group is generated by its symplectic transvections. More precisely, if $(V,J)$ is a finite-dimensional symplectic vector space over $\mathbb{F}$, then ${\mathrm{Sp}(V,\omega)}$ is generated by the transformations
$$T_{v,\lambda}(x)=x+\lambda\,(x^TJv)\,v,$$
where $v\in V$ and $\lambda\in\mathbb{F}$. This is a general part of the structure theory of the classical groups, and appears in early form in work of Dieudonné; see also later treatments devoted specifically to symplectic transvections and the subgroups they generate.

==== Generation by involutions ====
The symplectic group $\operatorname{Sp}(2n,\mathbb{F})$ can be generated by linear transformations $A:V\to V$ of the symplectic vector space $(V,J)$ such that $A^2 = I$ and $A^TJA = -J$.

=== Example of symplectic matrices ===
For $\operatorname{Sp}(2,\mathbb{R})$, the group of $2\times 2$ matrices with determinant $1$, the three symplectic $(0,1)$-matrices are:
$$\begin{pmatrix} 1 & 0 \\ 0 & 1 \end{pmatrix},\quad \begin{pmatrix} 1 & 0 \\ 1 & 1 \end{pmatrix}\quad \text{and} \quad
\begin{pmatrix} 1 & 1 \\ 0 & 1 \end{pmatrix}.$$

==== Sp(2n, R) ====
It turns out that $\operatorname{Sp}(2n,\mathbb{R})$ can have a fairly explicit description using generators. If we let $\operatorname{Sym}(n)$ denote the symmetric $n\times n$ matrices, then $\operatorname{Sp}(2n,\mathbb{R})$ is generated by $D(n)\cup N(n) \cup \{\Omega\},$ where
$$\begin{align}
D(n) &= \left\{ \left. \begin{bmatrix} A & 0 \\ 0 & (A^T)^{-1} \end{bmatrix} \,\right| \, A \in \operatorname{GL}(n, \mathbb{R})
\right\} \\[6pt]
N(n) &= \left\{ \left. \begin{bmatrix} I_n & B \\ 0 & I_n \end{bmatrix} \, \right| \, B \in \operatorname{Sym}(n)\right\}
\end{align}$$
are subgroups of $\operatorname{Sp}(2n,\mathbb{R})$.

=== Relationship with symplectic geometry ===
Symplectic geometry is the study of symplectic manifolds. The tangent space at any point on a symplectic manifold is a symplectic vector space. As noted earlier, structure preserving transformations of a symplectic vector space form a group and this group is $\operatorname{Sp}(2n,\mathbb{F})$, depending on the dimension of the space and the field over which it is defined.

A symplectic vector space is itself a symplectic manifold. A transformation under an action of the symplectic group is thus, in a sense, a linearised version of a symplectomorphism which is a more general structure preserving transformation on a symplectic manifold.

== Sp(n) ==
The compact symplectic group $\operatorname{Sp}(n)$ is the intersection of $\operatorname{Sp}(2n,\mathbb{C})$ with the $2n\times 2n$ unitary group:

$$\operatorname{Sp}(n):=\operatorname{Sp}(2n;\mathbb{C})\cap\operatorname{U}(2n)=\operatorname{Sp}(2n;\mathbb{C})\cap\operatorname {SU} (2n).$$

It is sometimes written as $\operatorname{USp}(2n)$. Alternatively, $\operatorname{Sp}(n)$ can be described as the subgroup of $\operatorname{GL}(n,\mathbb{H})$ (invertible quaternionic matrices) that preserves the standard hermitian form on $\mathbb{H}^n$:

$$\langle x, y\rangle = \bar x_1 y_1 + \cdots + \bar x_n y_n.$$

That is, $\operatorname{Sp}(n)$ is just the quaternionic unitary group, $\operatorname{U}(n,\mathbb{H})$. Indeed, it is sometimes called the hyperunitary group. Also $\operatorname{Sp}(1)$ is the group of quaternions of norm $1$, equivalent to SU(2) and topologically a 3-sphere $\mathcal{S}^3$.

Note that $\operatorname{Sp}(n)$ is not a symplectic group in the sense of the previous section—it does not preserve a non-degenerate skew-symmetric $\mathbb{H}$-bilinear form on $\mathbb{H}^n$: there is no such form except the zero form. Rather, it is isomorphic to a subgroup of $\operatorname{Sp}(2n,\mathbb{C})$, and so does preserve a complex symplectic form in a vector space of twice the dimension. As explained below, the Lie algebra of $\operatorname{Sp}(n)$ is the compact real form of the complex symplectic Lie algebra $\mathfrak{sp}(2n,\mathbb{C})$.

$\operatorname{Sp}(n)$ is a real Lie group with (real) dimension $n(2n+1)$. It is compact and simply connected.

The Lie algebra of $\operatorname{Sp}(n)$ is given by the quaternionic skew-Hermitian matrices, the set of $n\times n$ quaternionic matrices that satisfy

$$A+A^{\dagger} = 0$$

where $A^{\dagger}$ is the conjugate transpose of $A$ (here one takes the quaternionic conjugate). The Lie bracket is given by the commutator.

=== Important subgroups ===
Some main subgroups are:

$$\operatorname{Sp}(n) \supset \operatorname{Sp}(n-1)$$
$$\operatorname{Sp}(n) \supset \operatorname{U}(n)$$
$$\operatorname{Sp}(2) \supset \operatorname{O}(4)$$

Conversely it is itself a subgroup of some other groups:

$$\operatorname{SU}(2n) \supset \operatorname{Sp}(n)$$
$$\operatorname{F}_4 \supset \operatorname{Sp}(4)$$
$$\operatorname{G}_2 \supset \operatorname{Sp}(1)$$

There are also the isomorphisms of the Lie algebras $\mathfrak{sp}(2)=\mathfrak{so}(5)$ and $\mathfrak{sp}(1)=\mathfrak{so}(3)=\mathfrak{su}(2)$.

The unitary symplectic group $\operatorname{USp}(n)$ can be represented in terms of a Clifford algebra defined as a tensor product of quaternion algebras called hyperquaternion numbers. One has, $\mathbb{H}^{\otimes 2}=\mathbb{H}\otimes_\mathbb{R}\mathbb{H}=M_{4\times 4}(\mathbb{R})= Cl_{3,1}\mathbb{(R)}$. Hence, $\mathbb{H}^{\otimes 3}=M_{4\times 4}(\mathbb{H})$ entails the compact symplectic group $\operatorname{USp}(4)$.

== Sp(2n, Z) ==
The integral symplectic group $\operatorname{Sp}(2n,\mathbb{Z})$ is the subgroup of $\operatorname{Sp}(2n,\mathbb{R})$ consisting of matrices with integer entries. Equivalently, it is the group of $2n\times 2n$ integer matrices preserving the standard symplectic form:

$$\operatorname{Sp}(2n,\mathbb{Z})=\{M\in M_{2n}(\mathbb{Z}): M^\mathrm{T}JM=J\},$$

where

$$J=\begin{pmatrix}0&I_n\\-I_n&0\end{pmatrix}.$$

For $n=1$, this group coincides with the modular group $\operatorname{SL}(2,\mathbb{Z})$.

The group $\operatorname{Sp}(2n,\mathbb{Z})$ acts on the Siegel upper half-space, the space of symmetric complex $n\times n$ matrices with positive-definite imaginary part, by fractional linear transformations

$$\gamma\cdot\tau=(A\tau+B)(C\tau+D)^{-1}, \qquad
\gamma=\begin{pmatrix}A&B\\C&D\end{pmatrix}\in \operatorname{Sp}(2n,\mathbb{Z}).$$

For this reason, $\operatorname{Sp}(2n,\mathbb{Z})$ is also called the Siegel modular group of degree $n$.

Its congruence subgroups, such as the principal congruence subgroup

$$\Gamma_n(m)=\{\gamma\in\operatorname{Sp}(2n,\mathbb{Z}): \gamma\equiv I_{2n}\pmod m\},$$

play a central role in the theory of Siegel modular forms. The quotient of Siegel upper half-space by $\operatorname{Sp}(2n,\mathbb{Z})$ is the moduli space of principally polarized abelian varieties of dimension $n$, and quotients by congruence subgroups correspond to adding level structure.

Other arithmetic subgroups of the symplectic group, such as paramodular groups are also studied in arithmetic geometry.

== Relationship between the symplectic groups ==
Every complex, semisimple Lie algebra has a split real form and a compact real form; the former is called a complexification of the latter two.

The Lie algebra of $\operatorname{Sp}(2n,\mathbb{C})$ is semisimple and is denoted $\mathfrak{sp}(2n,\mathbb{C})$. Its split real form is $\mathfrak{sp}(2n,\mathbb{R})$ and its compact real form is $\mathfrak{sp}(n)$. These correspond to the Lie groups $\operatorname{Sp}(2n,\mathbb{R})$ and $\operatorname{Sp}(n)$ respectively.

The algebras, $\mathfrak{sp}(p,n-p)$, which are the Lie algebras of $\operatorname{Sp}(p,n-p)$, are the indefinite signature equivalent to the compact form.

=== Accidental isomorphisms ===
A number of accidental isomorphisms also exist, with various spin groups:

- $\operatorname{Sp}(2,\mathbb{F})\cong\operatorname{SL}(2,\mathbb{F})$ (in characteristic different from two), and $\operatorname{Sp}(2,\mathbb{R})\cong\operatorname{Spin}_0(1,2)$. This is because the special linear group automatically preserves any symplectic form in two dimensions.
- $\operatorname{Sp}(1)\cong\operatorname{SU}(2)\cong\operatorname{Spin}(3)$
- $\operatorname{Spin}(4)\cong\operatorname{Sp}(1)\times\operatorname{Sp}(1)$
- $\operatorname{Sp}(2)\cong\operatorname{Spin}(5)$. This isomorphism is exhibited by identifying $\operatorname{Sp}(2)$ with the group of $2\times 2$ quaternionic matrices $g\in M_2(\mathbb H)$ such that $g^*g=I$ where $g^*=\bar g^T$ is the conjugate-transpose of $x$. The reduced trace on $M_2(\mathbb H)$ is invariant under $\operatorname{Sp}(2)$-conjugation, and the space of (reduced-)trace-free $x\in M_2(\mathbb H)$ such that $x^*=x$ is a five-dimensional euclidean space, with quadratic form $\operatorname{tr}_{\mathrm{red}}(x^2)$.
- $\operatorname{Sp}(1,1)\cong\operatorname{Spin}_0(1,4)$. This isomorphism is exhibited by identifying $\operatorname{Sp}(1,1)$ with the group of $2\times 2$ quaternionic matrices $g\in M_2(\mathbb H)$ such that $g^*Kg=K$ where
  $$K=\begin{bmatrix}0&1\\1 &0\end{bmatrix}$$
  and $g^*=\bar g^T$ is the conjugate-transpose of $x$. The reduced trace is invariant under $\operatorname{Sp}(1,1)$-conjugation, and the space of (reduced-)trace-free $x\in M_2(\mathbb H)$ such that $Kx^*K=x$ is a five-dimensional pseudo-euclidean space, with quadratic form $\operatorname{tr}_{\mathrm{red}}(x^2)$, of signature $(1,4)$.
- $\operatorname{Sp}(4,\mathbb{R})\cong\operatorname{Spin}_0(2,3)$. Identify $\operatorname{Sp}(4,\mathbb{R})$ as the subset of the ring $M_4(\mathbb{R})$ of $4\times 4$ real matrices $g$ such that $gJg^T = J$ where
  $$J=\begin{bmatrix}0&I\\-I&0\end{bmatrix}$$
  (with $2\times 2$ blocks, and $I$ the $2\times 2$ identity matrix). The subspace $V\subset M_4(\mathbb{R})$ consisting of the trace-free matrices $J$ such that $x = -Jx^TJ$ is five-dimensional, and the trace form defines a signature $(2,3)$ pseudo-euclidean metric on it, which is preserved by the action $x\mapsto gxg^{-1}$ of $\operatorname{Sp}(4,\mathbb{R})$.

== Physical significance ==
=== Classical mechanics ===
The real symplectic group $\operatorname{Sp}(2n,\mathbb{R})$ arises in Hamiltonian mechanics as the group of linear canonical transformations of phase space. In canonical coordinates

$$(q^1,\dots,q^n,p_1,\dots,p_n),$$

its elements are precisely the linear changes of variables that preserve the standard symplectic form, or equivalently the Poisson bracket.

The Lie algebra $\mathfrak{sp}(2n,\mathbb{R})$ is naturally identified with quadratic Hamiltonians on phase space: if

$$H(z)=\tfrac12 z^\mathrm{T}Kz,$$

then the corresponding Hamiltonian flow is linear and defines a one-parameter subgroup of $\operatorname{Sp}(2n,\mathbb{R})$. In this sense, the symplectic group is generated by quadratic Hamiltonians.

=== Quantum mechanics and the metaplectic group ===
The symplectic group acts by linear changes of coordinates in the phase space of classical mechanics. When one tries to make the same transformations act on the wavefunctions of quantum mechanics, there is a phase ambiguity, and it is necessary to pass to a double cover. The metaplectic group is a double cover of the symplectic group over $\mathbb{R}$. (It has analogues over other local fields, finite fields, and adele rings.)

== See also ==
- Hamiltonian mechanics
- Metaplectic group
- Orthogonal group
- Paramodular group
- Projective unitary group
- Representations of classical Lie groups
- Symplectic manifold, Symplectic matrix, Symplectic vector space, Symplectic representation
- Unitary group
- Θ10
