= Siegel upper half-space =

Space of complex matrices with positive definite imaginary part

In mathematics, given a positive integer $g$, the Siegel upper half-space $\mathcal H_g$ of degree $g$ is the set of $g \times g$ symmetric matrices over the complex numbers whose imaginary part is positive definite. It was introduced by Siegel (1939). The space $\mathcal H_g$ is the symmetric space associated to the symplectic group $\mathrm{Sp}(2g,\mathbb R)$. When $g=1$ one recovers the Poincaré upper half-plane.

The space $\mathcal H_g$ is sometimes called the Siegel upper half-plane.

== Definitions ==
=== As a complex domain ===
The space $\mathcal H_g$ is the subset of $M_g(\mathbb C)$ defined by :

$$\mathcal H_g = \{ X+iY : X, Y \in M_g(\mathbb R), X^t = X,\, Y^t = Y,\, Y \text{ is definite positive} \}.$$

It is an open subset in the space of $g\times g$ complex symmetric matrices, hence it is a complex manifold of complex dimension $\tfrac{g(g+1)} 2$.

This is a special case of a Siegel domain.

=== As a symmetric space ===
The symplectic group $\mathrm{Sp}(2g, \mathbb R)$ can be defined as the following matrix group:

$$\mathrm{Sp}(2g, \mathbb R) = \left\{ \begin{pmatrix} A & B \\ C & D \end{pmatrix}: A, B, C, D \in M_g(\mathbb R) ,\, AB^t- BA^t = 0, CD^t - DC^t = 0, AD^t - BC^t = 1_g \right\}.$$

It acts on $\mathcal H_g$ as follows:

$$Z\mapsto (AZ+B)(CZ+D)^{-1} \text{ where } Z\in\mathcal{H}_g, \begin{pmatrix}A&B\\ C&D\end{pmatrix}\in \mathrm{Sp}_{2g}(\mathbb{R}).$$

This action is continuous and transitive, with kernel $\pm I$ so that the action of $PSp(2g,\mathbb R)$ is faithful. The stabiliser of the point $i1_g \in \mathcal H_g$ for this action is the unitary subgroup $U(g)$, which is a maximal compact subgroup of $\mathrm{Sp}(2g, \mathbb R)$. Hence $\mathcal H_g$ is diffeomorphic to the symmetric space of $\mathrm{Sp}(2g, \mathbb R)$.

=== As a space of Kähler structures ===
The Siegel upper half-space can be described in terms of a fixed real symplectic vector space $V$, with symplectic form $\omega$. A compatible complex structure on $V$ is a linear complex structure on $V$, such that $\omega(Jx,Jy) = \omega(x,y)$ for all $x,y\in V$. A compatible complex structure is Kähler if the quadratic form $Q_J(x)=\omega(x,Jx)$ is positive-definite. The Siegel upper half-space $\mathfrak H_g$ can be identified with the space of Kähler structures of a $2g$-dimensional symplectic space.

The symplectic group acts transitively on the Kähler structures, so the Siegel upper half-space as a homogeneous space is the orbit of a fixed Kähler structure modulo its isotropy:
$$\mathfrak H_g = \mathrm{Sp}(2g,\mathbb R)/\mathrm U(g).$$

== Basic properties and geometry ==
The space $\mathcal H_g$ may be written as
$$\mathcal H_g = \operatorname{Sym}_g(\mathbb R) + i\,\mathcal P_g,$$
where $\operatorname{Sym}_g(\mathbb R)$ is the space of real symmetric $g\times g$ matrices and $\mathcal P_g$ is the cone of positive-definite real symmetric matrices. In particular, $\mathcal H_g$ is a tube domain, and hence a convex domain, in the complex vector space of symmetric matrices. The Shilov boundary is the Lagrangian Grassmannian $\Lambda(2g)$.

Geometrically, $\mathcal H_g$ is an irreducible Hermitian symmetric domain of Cartan type III. Equivalently, it may be identified with the symmetric space
$$\mathrm{Sp}(2g,\mathbb R)/U(g).$$

Via a Cayley transform, $\mathcal H_g$ is biholomorphic to a bounded symmetric domain, namely the Siegel disk
$$\{W\in M_g(\mathbb C): W^t=W,\ I_g-W^*\!W>0\}.$$

As a real manifold, every symmetric domain is diffeomorphic to a Euclidean space; in the present case this gives
$$\mathcal H_g \cong \mathbb R^{g(g+1)},$$
so $\mathcal H_g$ is connected and simply connected.

As a bounded symmetric domain, $\mathcal H_g$ carries a canonical invariant Kähler metric, namely the Bergman metric, under which it is a Hermitian symmetric space of negative curvature. In coordinates $Z=X+iY$, this invariant metric is given by
$$ds^2=\operatorname{tr}(Y^{-1}dZ\,Y^{-1}d\bar Z).$$
When $g=1$, the space $\mathcal H_1$ is the Poincaré upper half-plane, and this metric reduces to the usual Poincaré metric. The metric can be written
$$g = \operatorname{tr}\left((t^{-1}d\tau)(t^{-1}d\bar\tau)\right),\quad \tau = s+it.$$

== Relation with moduli spaces of Abelian varieties ==
=== Siegel modular group ===
The Siegel modular group is the arithmetic subgroup $\Gamma_g = \mathrm{Sp}(2g, \mathbb Z)$ of $\mathrm{Sp}(2g, \mathbb R)$.

=== Moduli spaces ===
The quotient $\Gamma_g\backslash\mathcal H_g$ can be interpreted as the moduli space of $g$-dimensional principally polarised complex abelian varieties. If $\tau\in\mathcal H_g$, then the lattice
$$\Lambda_\tau=\mathbb Z^g+\tau\mathbb Z^g$$
defines a complex torus
$$A_\tau=\mathbb C^g/\Lambda_\tau.$$
The condition that $\operatorname{Im}\tau$ be positive definite implies that $A_\tau$ is an abelian variety, and the corresponding Riemann form defines a principal polarisation. Conversely, every principally polarised complex abelian variety of dimension $g$ arises in this way. Thus $\Gamma_g\backslash\mathcal H_g$ parametrises principally polarised abelian varieties.

== Period matrices and the Riemann bilinear relations ==
The defining condition $\tau\in\mathcal H_g$ is closely related to the classical period matrices of compact Riemann surfaces and complex abelian varieties.

Let $S$ be a compact Riemann surface of genus $g$, and choose a symplectic basis
$$a_1,\dots,a_g,b_1,\dots,b_g$$
for $H_1(S,\mathbb Z)$, meaning that the intersection numbers satisfy
$$a_i\cdot a_j=b_i\cdot b_j=0,\qquad a_i\cdot b_j=\delta_{ij}.$$
If $\omega_1,\dots,\omega_g$ is a basis of the space of holomorphic 1-forms on $S$, its period matrix is the $g\times 2g$ matrix
$$P=\left(\int_{a_j}\omega_i\ ,\ \int_{b_j}\omega_i\right).$$
The Riemann bilinear relations imply that the $g\times g$ matrix of $a$-periods is invertible. After normalizing the basis of holomorphic 1-forms so that
$$\int_{a_j}\omega_i=\delta_{ij},$$
one obtains the normalized period matrix
$$\Omega_{ij}=\int_{b_j}\omega_i.$$
The bilinear relations then say precisely that $\Omega$ is symmetric and that $\operatorname{Im}(\Omega)$ is positive definite; equivalently,
$$\Omega\in\mathcal H_g.$$

This construction gives the Jacobian variety of $S$:
$$J(S)=\mathbb C^g/(\mathbb Z^g+\Omega\mathbb Z^g),$$
which is a principally polarised abelian variety. Thus the Siegel upper half-space contains all normalized period matrices of compact Riemann surfaces of genus $g$.

More generally, if $A$ is a principally polarised complex abelian variety of dimension $g$, then one can choose a symplectic basis for its period lattice so that the lattice is generated by the columns of
$$(I_g\ \Omega)$$
for a unique matrix $\Omega\in\mathcal H_g$ up to the action of $\operatorname{Sp}(2g,\mathbb Z)$. Conversely, every matrix $\Omega\in\mathcal H_g$ defines a principally polarised complex abelian variety
$$\mathbb C^g/(\mathbb Z^g+\Omega\mathbb Z^g).$$
In this sense, the Riemann bilinear relations explain why the Siegel upper half-space is the natural parameter space for period matrices.

Not every point of $\mathcal H_g$ is the period matrix of a compact Riemann surface when $g\geq 4$; determining which points arise in this way is the Schottky problem.

=== Torelli map ===
The assignment sending a smooth projective complex curve $C$ of genus $g$ to its Jacobian variety
$$J(C)=\operatorname{Pic}^0(C)$$
defines the Torelli map
$$j\colon \mathcal M_g \to \mathcal A_g,$$
from the moduli space of smooth curves of genus $g$ to the moduli space of principally polarised abelian varieties of dimension $g$. In terms of period matrices, this map sends a curve to the point of $\Gamma_g\backslash \mathcal H_g$ represented by its normalized period matrix.

The classical Torelli theorem states that a smooth complex curve is determined, up to isomorphism, by its principally polarised Jacobian. Equivalently, the Torelli map is injective on geometric points. Its image is called the Jacobian locus or Torelli locus.

The Torelli map relates the geometry of curves to the geometry of the Siegel modular variety $\mathcal A_g$. For $g\ge 4$ its image is a proper subvariety of $\mathcal A_g$, since
$$\dim \mathcal M_g = 3g-3 \qquad\text{and}\qquad \dim \mathcal A_g = \frac{g(g+1)}{2}.$$
Determining which principally polarised abelian varieties arise as Jacobians is the Schottky problem.

== Compactifications ==
The quotient $A_g=\Gamma_g\backslash\mathcal H_g$ is not compact. A standard compactification is the Satake–Baily–Borel compactification $A_g^*$, obtained by adjoining the rational boundary components of the Siegel upper half-space. This compactification is a projective algebraic variety, and is often called the minimal compactification. For $g=1$ this reduces to the familiar compactification of modular curves by adding cusp points.

A finer class of compactifications is given by toroidal compactifications, which depend on the choice of an admissible rational polyhedral cone decomposition. For a projective admissible decomposition, the resulting toroidal compactification $A_g^\Sigma$ is projective, and there is a natural morphism
$$A_g^\Sigma \to A_g^*.$$
If one replaces $\Gamma_g$ by a neat arithmetic subgroup, one can choose smooth toroidal compactifications with boundary a divisor.

Among the best-known toroidal compactifications for the full Siegel modular group are the Igusa compactification (coming from the central cone decomposition) and the second Voronoi compactification.

== See also ==
- Bogoliubov transformation, a transformation along the real axis of the Siegel half-plane
- Paramodular group, a generalization of the Siegel modular group
- Siegel modular form, a type of automorphic form defined on the Siegel upper half-space
- Siegel modular variety, a moduli space constructed as a quotient of the Siegel upper half-space
