= Smith conjecture =

Theorem in topology

In mathematics, the Smith conjecture states that if f is a diffeomorphism of the 3-sphere of finite order, then the fixed point set of f cannot be a nontrivial knot.

Paul A. Smith (1939, remark after theorem 4) showed that a non-trivial orientation-preserving diffeomorphism of finite order with fixed points must have a fixed point set equal to a circle, and asked in (Eilenberg 1949, Problem 36) if the fixed point set could be knotted. Friedhelm Waldhausen (1969) proved the Smith conjecture for the special case of diffeomorphisms of order 2 (and hence any even order). The proof of the general case was described by John Morgan and Hyman Bass (1984) and depended on several major advances in 3-manifold theory, In particular the work of William Thurston on hyperbolic structures on 3-manifolds, and results by William Meeks and Shing-Tung Yau on minimal surfaces in 3-manifolds, with some additional help from Bass, Cameron Gordon, Peter Shalen, and Rick Litherland.

Deane Montgomery and Leo Zippin (1954) gave an example of a continuous involution of the 3-sphere whose fixed point set is a wildly embedded circle, so the Smith conjecture is false in the topological (rather than the smooth or PL) category. Charles Giffen (1966) showed that the analogue of the Smith conjecture in higher dimensions is false: the fixed point set of a periodic diffeomorphism of a sphere of dimension at least 4 can be a knotted sphere of codimension 2.

== See also ==
- Hilbert–Smith conjecture
