= Locally profinite group =

In mathematics, a locally profinite group is a Hausdorff topological group in which every neighborhood of the identity element contains a compact open subgroup. Equivalently, a locally profinite group is a topological group that is Hausdorff, locally compact, and totally disconnected. Moreover, a locally profinite group is compact if and only if it is profinite; this explains the terminology. Basic examples of locally profinite groups are discrete groups and the p-adic Lie groups. Non-examples are real Lie groups, which have the no small subgroup property.

In a locally profinite group, a closed subgroup is locally profinite, and every compact subgroup is contained in an open compact subgroup.

== Examples ==
Important examples of locally profinite groups come from algebraic number theory. Let F be a non-archimedean local field. Then both F and $F^\times$ are locally profinite. More generally, the matrix ring $\operatorname{M}_n(F)$ and the general linear group $\operatorname{GL}_n(F)$ are locally profinite. Another example of a locally profinite group is the absolute Weil group of a non-archimedean local field: this is in contrast to the fact that the absolute Galois group of such is profinite (in particular compact).

== Representations of a locally profinite group ==
Let G be a locally profinite group. Then a group homomorphism $\psi: G \to \mathbb{C}^\times$ is continuous if and only if it has open kernel.

Let $(\rho, V)$ be a complex representation of G. $\rho$ is said to be smooth if V is a union of $V^K$ where K runs over all open compact subgroups K. $\rho$ is said to be admissible if it is smooth and $V^K$ is finite-dimensional for any open compact subgroup K.

We now make a blanket assumption that $G/K$ is at most countable for all open compact subgroups K.

The dual space $V^*$ carries the action $\rho^*$ of G given by $\left\langle \rho^*(g) \alpha, v \right\rangle = \left\langle \alpha, \rho^*(g^{-1}) v \right\rangle$. In general, $\rho^*$ is not smooth. Thus, we set $\widetilde{V} = \bigcup_K (V^*)^K$ where $K$ is acting through $\rho^*$ and set $\widetilde{\rho} = \rho^*$. The smooth representation $(\widetilde{\rho}, \widetilde{V})$ is then called the contragredient or smooth dual of $(\rho, V)$.

The contravariant functor

$$(\rho, V) \mapsto (\widetilde{\rho}, \widetilde{V})$$

from the category of smooth representations of G to itself is exact. Moreover, the following are equivalent.

- $\rho$ is admissible.
- $\widetilde{\rho}$ is admissible.
- The canonical G-module map $\rho \to \widetilde{\widetilde{\rho}}$ is an isomorphism.

When $\rho$ is admissible, $\rho$ is irreducible if and only if $\widetilde{\rho}$ is irreducible.

The countability assumption at the beginning is really necessary, for there exists a locally profinite group that admits an irreducible smooth representation $\rho$ such that $\widetilde{\rho}$ is not irreducible.

== Hecke algebra of a locally profinite group ==
Let $G$ be a unimodular locally profinite group such that $G/K$ is at most countable for all open compact subgroups K, and $\mu$ a left Haar measure on $G$. Let $C^\infty_c(G)$ denote the space of locally constant functions on $G$ with compact support. With the multiplicative structure given by

$$(f * h)(x) = \int_G f(g) h(g^{-1} x) d \mu(g)$$

$C^\infty_c(G)$ becomes not necessarily unital associative $\mathbb{C}$-algebra. It is called the Hecke algebra of G and is denoted by $\mathfrak{H}(G)$. The algebra plays an important role in the study of smooth representations of locally profinite groups. Indeed, one has the following: given a smooth representation $(\rho, V)$ of G, we define a new action on V:

$$\rho(f) = \int_G f(g) \rho(g) d\mu(g).$$

Thus, we have the functor $\rho \mapsto \rho$ from the category of smooth representations of $G$ to the category of non-degenerate $\mathfrak{H}(G)$-modules. Here, "non-degenerate" means $\rho(\mathfrak{H}(G))V=V$. Then the fact is that the functor is an equivalence.
