= Deodhar =

Deodhar is an Indian surname typically found in the western state of Maharashtra. Notable people with this surname include:

- B. R. Deodhar, Indian singer, musicologist, and music educator
- D. B. Deodhar, cricketer
- Vinay V. Deodhar (died 2015), Indian mathematician
- Sayali Deodhar, Marathi Actress
