= Gopal Prasad =

Indian-American mathematician (born 1935)

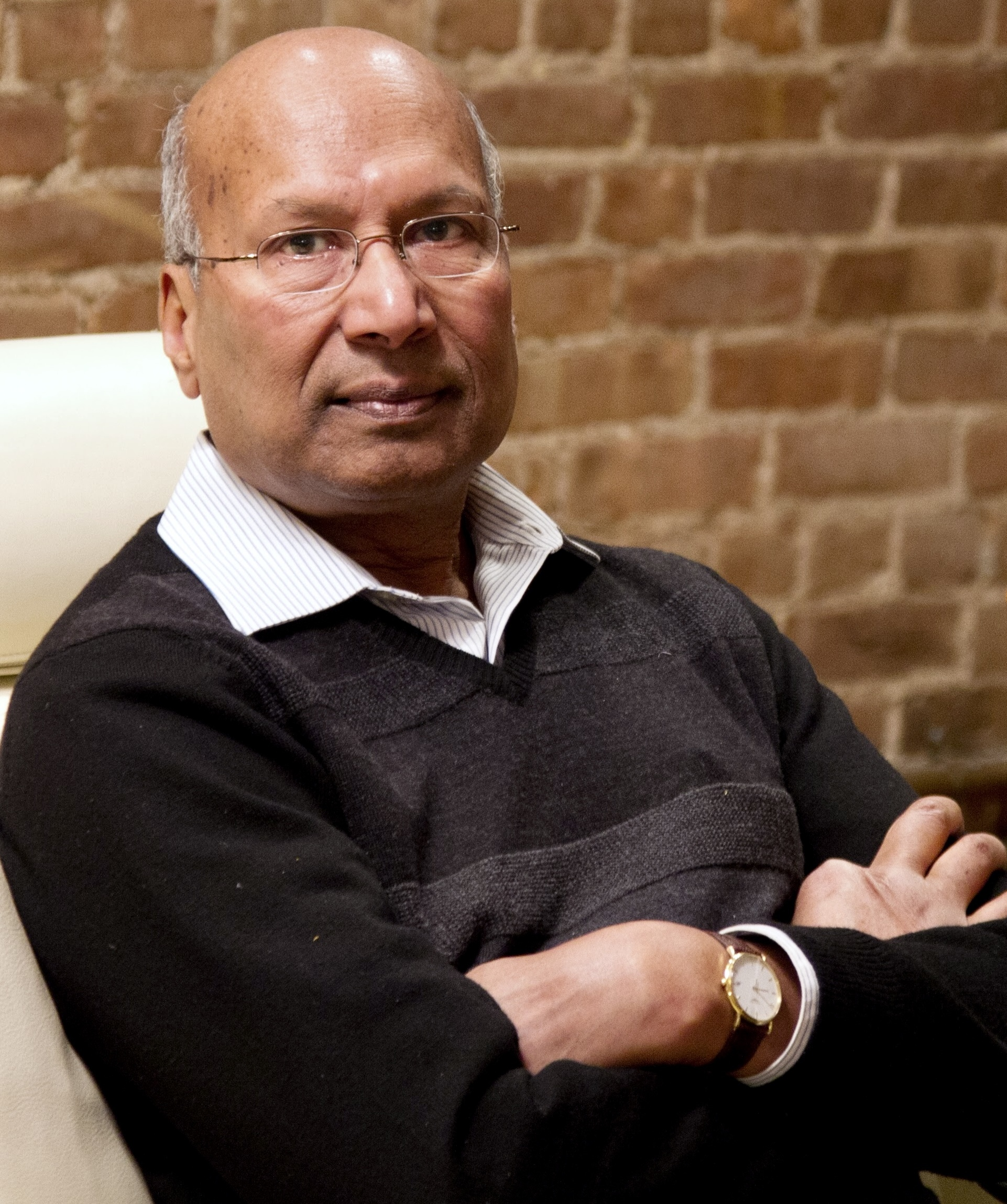
- Born: 31 July 1945 (age 81); Ghazipur, British India
- Education: Magadh University; Patna University; TIFR
- Awards: Shanti Swarup Bhatnagar Award (1989); Guggenheim Fellowship (1998); Humboldt Research Award (2006); Fellow of: American Mathematical Society (2012), Indian Academy of Sciences (1984), Indian National Science Academy (1982)
- Scientific career
- Fields: Mathematics
- Workplaces: University of Michigan
- Doctoral advisor: M. S. Raghunathan

Gopal Prasad (born 31 July 1945 in Ghazipur, India) is an Indian-American mathematician. His research interests span the fields of Lie groups, their discrete subgroups, algebraic groups, arithmetic groups, geometry of locally symmetric spaces, and representation theory of reductive p-adic groups.

He is the Raoul Bott Professor of Mathematics at the University of Michigan in Ann Arbor.

== Education ==
Prasad earned his bachelor's degree with honors in Mathematics from Magadh University in 1963. Two years later, in 1965, he received his master's degree in Mathematics from Patna University. After a brief stay at the Indian Institute of Technology Kanpur in their Ph.D. program for Mathematics, Prasad entered the Ph.D. program at the Tata Institute of Fundamental Research (TIFR) in 1966. There he began a long and extensive collaboration with his advisor M. S. Raghunathan on several topics including the study of lattices in semi-simple Lie groups and the congruence subgroup problem. In 1976, Prasad received his Ph.D. from the University of Mumbai. Prasad became an associate professor at TIFR in 1979, and a professor in 1984. In 1992 he left TIFR to join the faculty at the University of Michigan in Ann Arbor, where he is the Raoul Bott Professor Emeritus of Mathematics.

== Family ==
Gopal Prasad's parents were Ram Krishna Prasad and Lakshmi Devi. Ram Krishna Prasad was a social worker, philanthropist, and was jailed by the British for his participation in the Indian freedom struggle against British rule. The family was involved in retail, and wholesale businesses. In 1969, he married Indu Devi (née Poddar) of Deoria. Gopal Prasad and Indu Devi have a son, Anoop Prasad, who is managing director at D.E. Shaw & Co, and a daughter, Ila Fiete, who is Professor of Neuroscience at MIT, and five grandchildren. Shrawan Kumar, Professor of Mathematics at the University of North Carolina at Chapel Hill, Pawan Kumar, Professor of Astrophysics at the University of Texas, Austin and Dipendra Prasad, Professor of Mathematics at the Indian Institute of Technology, Mumbai, are his younger brothers.

== Some contributions to mathematics ==
Prasad's early work was on discrete subgroups of real and p-adic semi-simple groups. He proved the "strong rigidity" of lattices in real semi-simple groups of rank 1 and also of lattices in p-adic groups, see [1] and [2]. He then tackled group-theoretic and arithmetic questions on semi-simple algebraic groups. He proved the "strong approximation" property for simply connected semi-simple groups over global function fields [3]. Prasad determined the topological central extensions of these groups and computed the "metaplectic kernel" for isotropic groups in collaboration with M. S. Raghunathan, see [11], [12] and [10]. Prasad and Raghunathan have also obtained results on the Kneser-Tits problem, [13]. Later, together with Andrei Rapinchuk, Prasad gave a precise computation of the metaplectic kernel for all simply connected semi-simple groups, see [14].

In 1987, Prasad found a formula for the volume of S-arithmetic quotients of semi-simple groups, [4]. Using this formula and certain number theoretic and Galois-cohomological estimates, Armand Borel and Gopal Prasad proved several finiteness theorems about arithmetic groups, [6]. The volume formula, together with number-theoretic and Bruhat-Tits theoretic considerations led to a classification, by Gopal Prasad and Sai-Kee Yeung, of fake projective planes (in the theory of smooth projective complex surfaces) into 28 non-empty classes [21] (see also [22] and [23]). This classification, together with computations by Donald Cartwright and Tim Steger, has led to a complete list of fake projective planes. This list consists of exactly 50 fake projective planes, up to isometry (distributed among the 28 classes). This work was the subject of a talk in the Bourbaki seminar.

Prasad has worked on the representation theory of reductive p-adic groups with Allen Moy. The filtrations of parahoric subgroups, referred to as the "Moy-Prasad filtration", is widely used in representation theory and harmonic analysis. Moy and Prasad used these filtrations and Bruhat–Tits theory to prove the existence of "unrefined minimal K-types", to define the notion of "depth" of an irreducible admissible representation and to give a classification of representations of depth zero, see [8] and [9]. The results and techniques introduced in these two papers [8],[9] enabled a series of important developments in the field.

In collaboration with Andrei Rapinchuk, Prasad has studied Zariski-dense subgroups of semi-simple groups and proved the existence in such a subgroup of regular semi-simple elements with many desirable properties, [15], [16]. These elements have been used in the investigation of geometric and ergodic theoretic questions. Prasad and Rapinchuk introduced a new notion of "weak-commensurability" of arithmetic subgroups and determined "weak- commensurability classes" of arithmetic groups in a given semi-simple group. They used their results on weak-commensurability to obtain results on length-commensurable and isospectral arithmetic locally symmetric spaces, see [17], [18] and [19].

Together with Jiu-Kang Yu, Prasad has studied the fixed point set under the action of a finite group of automorphisms of a reductive p-adic group G on the Bruhat-Building of G, [24]. In another joint work, that has been used in the geometric Langlands program, Prasad and Yu determined all the quasi-reductive group schemes over a discrete valuation ring (DVR), [25].

In collaboration with Brian Conrad and Ofer Gabber, Prasad has studied the structure of pseudo-reductive groups, and also provided proofs of the conjugacy theorems for general smooth connected linear algebraic groups, announced without detailed proofs by Armand Borel and Jacques Tits; their research monograph [26] contains all this. A second monograph [27] contains a complete classification of pseudo-reductive groups, including a Tits-style classification and also many interesting examples. The classification of pseudo-reductive groups already has many applications. There was a Bourbaki seminar in March 2010 on the work of Tits, Conrad-Gabber-Prasad on pseudo-reductive groups.

Prasad has developed new methods for unramified and tamely ramified descents in Bruhat-Tits theory [28][29]. Together with Tasho Kaletha, he has recently written a book [30] on Bruhat-Tits theory which contains new proofs of several results.

== Honors ==
Prasad has received the Guggenheim Fellowship, the Humboldt Senior Research Award, and the Raoul Bott Professorship at the University of Michigan. He was awarded the Shanti Swarup Bhatnagar prize (by the Council of Scientific and Industrial Research of the Government of India). He has received Fellowships in the Indian National Science Academy, the Indian Academy of Sciences. Prasad gave an invited talk in the International Congress of Mathematicians held in Kyoto in 1990. In 2012 he became a fellow of the American Mathematical Society. He has served on the Mathematical Sciences jury of the Infosys Prize from 2011 to 2018.

Prasad was the Managing Editor of the Michigan Mathematical Journal for over a decade, an Associate Editor of the Annals of Mathematics for six years, and is an editor of the Asian Journal of Mathematics since its inception.
