= Jessica Fintzen =

German mathematician

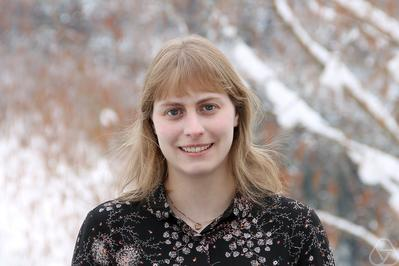
Fintzen at the Oberwolfach Research Institute for Mathematics, 2016

Jessica Fintzen is a German mathematician whose research concerns the representation theory of algebraic groups over the p-adic numbers, with connections to the Langlands program. She is a professor at the University of Bonn.

== Education and career ==
Fintzen competed for Germany in the 2008 International Mathematical Olympiad, earning a bronze medal, and earned a bachelor's degree in mathematics from Jacobs University Bremen in 2011. She went to Harvard University for graduate study in mathematics, completing her Ph.D. in 2016. Her dissertation concerned the Moy–Prasad filtration and was supervised by Benedict Gross.

After postdoctoral research at the Institute for Advanced Study, University of Michigan, and Trinity College, Cambridge, she became an assistant professor of mathematics at Duke University and was promoted to full professor there in 2022. She was a Royal Society University Research Fellow and Lecturer at the University of Cambridge from 2020 to 2022. In 2022 she became a full professor at the University of Bonn.

== Recognition ==
Fintzen won the 2018 Friedrich Hirzebruch Dissertation prize of the German Academic Scholarship Foundation and Theodor Pfizer Foundation, and the 2018 Association for Women in Mathematics Dissertation Prize. She was named as a Sloan Research Fellow in 2021. In 2022, Fintzen won the Whitehead Prize, "for her groundbreaking work in representation theory, in particular as it relates to number theory via the (local) Langlands program". In 2024, she was awarded the Cole Prize in Algebra, and EMS Prize "for her transformative work on the representation theory of p-adic groups, in particular for her spectacular proof that Yu’s construction of supercuspidal representations is exhaustive".
