= Admissible representation =

Class of representations

In mathematics, admissible representations are a well-behaved class of representations used in the representation theory of reductive Lie groups and locally compact totally disconnected groups. They were introduced by Harish-Chandra.

== Real or complex reductive Lie groups ==
Let G be a connected reductive (real or complex) Lie group. Let K be a maximal compact subgroup. A continuous representation (π, V) of G on a complex Hilbert space V is called admissible if π restricted to K is unitary and each irreducible unitary representation of K occurs in it with finite multiplicity. The prototypical example is that of an irreducible unitary representation of G.

An admissible representation π induces a $(\mathfrak{g},K)$-module which is easier to deal with as it is an algebraic object. Two admissible representations are said to be infinitesimally equivalent if their associated $(\mathfrak{g},K)$-modules are isomorphic. Though for general admissible representations, this notion is different than the usual equivalence, it is an important result that the two notions of equivalence agree for unitary (admissible) representations. Additionally, there is a notion of unitarity of $(\mathfrak{g},K)$-modules. This reduces the study of the equivalence classes of irreducible unitary representations of G to the study of infinitesimal equivalence classes of admissible representations and the determination of which of these classes are infinitesimally unitary. The problem of parameterizing the infinitesimal equivalence classes of admissible representations was fully solved by Robert Langlands and is called the Langlands classification.

== Totally disconnected groups ==
Let G be a locally compact totally disconnected group (such as a reductive algebraic group over a nonarchimedean local field or over the finite adeles of a global field). A representation (π, V) of G on a complex vector space V is called smooth if the subgroup of G fixing any vector of V is open. If, in addition, the space of vectors fixed by any compact open subgroup is finite dimensional then π is called admissible. Admissible representations of p-adic groups admit more algebraic description through the action of the Hecke algebra of locally constant functions on G.

Deep studies of admissible representations of p-adic reductive groups were undertaken by Casselman and by Bernstein and Zelevinsky in the 1970s. Progress was made more recently by Howe, Moy, Gopal Prasad and Bushnell and Kutzko, who developed a theory of types and classified the admissible dual (i.e. the set of equivalence classes of irreducible admissible representations) in many cases.
