= M. S. Raghunathan =

Indian mathematician (born 1941)

- Born: Madabusi Santanam Raghunathan; 11 August 1941 (age 85); Anantapur, British India (now Andhra Pradesh, India)
- Education: University of Madras; TIFR; Institute for Advanced Study, Princeton
- Awards: Shanti Swarup Bhatnagar Award(1977); TWAS Prize (1991); Srinivasa Ramanujan Medal (1991); S. N. Bose Professorship (1993–1996); Padma Shri (2001); Padma Bhushan, (2012)
- Scientific career
- Fields: Mathematics
- Workplaces: TIFR
- Doctoral advisor: M.S. Narasimhan
- Doctoral students: Vinay V. Deodhar; Gopal Prasad

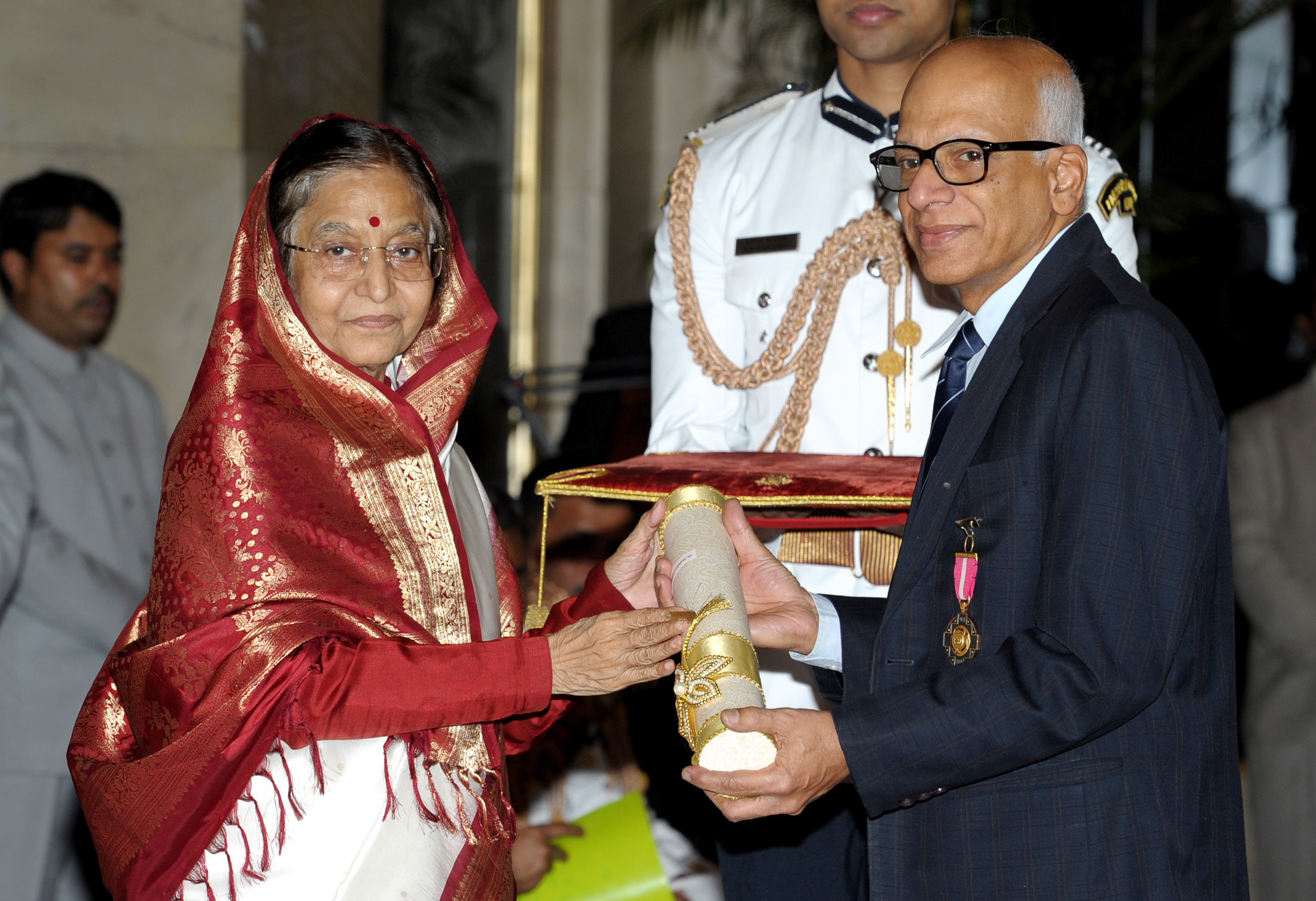
The President, Smt. Pratibha Devisingh Patil presenting the Padma Bhushan Award to Dr. Madabusi Santanam Raghunathan, at an Investiture Ceremony-II, at Rashtrapati Bhavan, in New Delhi on April 04, 2012

Madabusi Santanam Raghunathan FRS is an Indian mathematician. He is currently a Distinguished Professor of Mathematics at the Centre for Excellence in Basic Sciences (CEBS) in Mumbai, India. Previously, he was the Head of the National Centre for Mathematics, Indian Institute of Technology, Mumbai. Formerly Professor of eminence at TIFR in Homi Bhabha Chair. Raghunathan received his PhD in Mathematics from (TIFR), University of Mumbai; his advisor was M. S. Narasimhan. Raghunathan is a Fellow of the Royal Society, of the Third World Academy of Sciences, and of the American Mathematical Society and a recipient of the civilian honour of Padma Bhushan. He has also been on the Mathematical Sciences jury for the Infosys Prize from 2016.

== Early life and education ==
Madabusi Santanam Raghunathan was born on 11 August 1941 at Anantapur, Andhra Pradesh, his maternal grandparents' place. The family lived in Chennai. His father Santanam continued the family's timber business and expanded it through exports to Europe and Japan. He had earlier joined the Indian Institute of Science, Bangalore, after a BSc in Physics, but had to leave his studies mid-way to take care of the family business. Raghunathan fondly recalls that his father had a feeling for science and used to talk about it, making it very interesting to the children. Raghunathan's mother came from a family with an academic tradition. Her father was an esteemed Professor of English, who had contributed articles to the Cornhill Magazine. He also wrote, and published on his own, a book on William Makepeace Thackeray, which was later found to have been reprinted in the United States, without his knowledge, indeed in violation of the copyright he held.

Raghunathan had his schooling in Chennai, in P.S. High School, Mylapore and the Madras Christian College High School. He passed his SSLC (Secondary School Leaving Certificate) examination in 1955. There is a rather interesting story about it: after the Sanskrit paper he absent-mindedly left the examination hall along with his answer paper, and was intercepted on his way home by a fellow student, following commotion at the examination hall on account of the missing answer paper. He narrowly escaped having to reappear for the entire examination, thanks to the headmaster vouching for his integrity.

The University of Madras had the curious restriction of not admitting anyone under the age of 14 years and six months, though after attaining that age it was possible to be admitted even in higher classes. Raghunathan therefore pursued his Intermediate at the St. Joseph's College, Bangalore during 1955–57. He then returned to Chennai and joined B.A.(Hons.) in mathematics, in Vivekananda College, which had a very good reputation.

== Research ==
After initial training during 1960–62, he worked on a research problem suggested by Prof. M.S. Narasimhan, on "Deformations of linear connections and Riemannian metrics", and solved it by the summer of 1963.

He wrote his PhD thesis under the guidance of Professor Narasimhan and was awarded the degree by the University of Bombay in 1966. After completing his PhD, Raghunathan spent a year at the Institute for Advanced Study, Princeton, US. Through the years, he has held visiting position in many academic institutions in the US, Europe and Japan, for durations ranging from a few weeks to a year, and has spoken at several international conferences, including the 1970 International Congress of Mathematicians in Nice .

Discrete subgroups of Lie groups have been the central objects of his research. He has made contributions to rigidity and arithmeticity problems.

== Contribution ==
Raghunathan has also played an important role in the promotion of mathematics through various scientific bodies, in both advisory and administrative capacities. He organised the Ramanujan centenary celebrations in Chennai in 1987, with an international conference attended by the foremost number theorists.

His most important and comprehensive contribution in this sphere has been his role in the National Board for Higher Mathematics (NBHM). Raghunathan was a member of the Board since it was formed in 1983 and became its chairman in 1987. He continues to serve in that capacity. The Board has undertaken a variety of activities through the years: apart from providing financial support to mathematics libraries around the country and grants for research projects, organising conferences, travel to both national and international events and so on, the Board has taken a pro-active role in tapping mathematical talent through various activities, such as Olympiad activity, Mathematics Training and Talent Search, Scholarships/Fellowships at the M.Sc., Ph.D. and post- doctoral levels, and the rather innovative Nurture Programme conceived by Raghunathan to support learning of mathematics by students even while pursuing other career options. He organized the International Congress of Mathematicians (ICM 2010) at Hyderabad in India. This was the first ever ICM held in India.

== Published book ==
Raghunathan's book "Discrete Subgroups of Lie Groups", was published by Springer Verlag, Germany, in 1972. The book has been translated into Russian and published with an appendix by Grigory Margulis.
