= No small subgroup =

Restriction on topological groups in mathematics

In mathematics, especially in topology, a topological group $G$ is said to have no small subgroup if there exists a neighborhood $U$ of the identity that contains no nontrivial subgroup of $G.$ The abbreviation '"NSS"' is sometimes used for this property. A basic example of a topological group with no small subgroup is the general linear group over the complex numbers.

A locally compact, separable metric, locally connected group with no small subgroup is a Lie group. (cf. Hilbert's fifth problem.)

== See also ==
- Hilbert's fifth problem § No small subgroups
