= Paul Althaus Smith =

American mathematician

Smith (left, chin obscured), and Edmond Maillet at ICM 1932

Paul Althaus Smith (May 18, 1900 – June 13, 1980) was an American mathematician. His name occurs in two significant conjectures in geometric topology: the Smith conjecture, which is now a theorem, and the Hilbert–Smith conjecture, which was proved in dimension 3 in 2013. Smith theory is a theory about homeomorphisms of finite order of manifolds, particularly spheres.

Smith was a student of Solomon Lefschetz at the University of Kansas, moving to Princeton University with Lefschetz in the mid-1920s. He finished his doctorate at Princeton, in 1926. His Ph.D. thesis was published in the Annals of Mathematics that same year. He also worked with George David Birkhoff, with whom he wrote a 1928 paper in ergodic theory, entitled Structure analysis of surface transformations, which appeared in the Journal des Mathématiques.

He subsequently became a professor at Columbia University and at Barnard College. His students at Columbia included Sherman K. Stein and Moses Richardson. He has many academic descendants through Richardson and his student Louis Billera.

== Family ==
Smith was married to the Swiss–American early music pioneer Suzanne Bloch. They had two children.
