= Moy–Prasad filtration =

In mathematics, the Moy–Prasad filtration is a family of filtrations of p-adic reductive groups and their Lie algebras, named after Allen Moy and Gopal Prasad. The family is parameterized by the Bruhat–Tits building; that is, each point of the building gives a different filtration. Alternatively, since the initial term in each filtration at a point of the building is the parahoric subgroup for that point, the Moy–Prasad filtration can be viewed as a filtration of a parahoric subgroup of a reductive group.

The chief application of the Moy–Prasad filtration is to the representation theory of p-adic groups, where it can be used to define a certain rational number called the depth of a representation. The representations of depth r can be better understood by studying the rth Moy–Prasad subgroups. This information then leads to a better understanding of the overall structure of the representations, and that understanding in turn has applications to other areas of mathematics, such as number theory via the Langlands program.

For a detailed exposition of Moy-Prasad filtrations and the associated semi-stable points, see Chapter 13 of the book Bruhat-Tits theory: a new approach by Tasho Kaletha and Gopal Prasad.

== History ==
In their foundational work on the theory of buildings, Bruhat and Tits defined subgroups associated to concave functions of the root system. These subgroups are a special case of the Moy–Prasad subgroups, defined when the group is split. The main innovations of Moy and Prasad were to generalize Bruhat–Tits's construction to quasi-split groups, in particular tori, and to use the subgroups to study the representation theory of the ambient group.

== Examples ==
The following examples use the p-adic rational numbers $\mathbb{Q}_p$ and the p-adic integers $\mathbb{Z}_p$. A reader unfamiliar with these rings may instead replace $\mathbb{Q}_p$ by the rational numbers $\mathbb{Q}$ and $\mathbb{Z}_p$ by the integers $\mathbb{Z}$ without losing the main idea.

=== Multiplicative group ===
The simplest example of a p-adic reductive group is $\mathbb{Q}_p^\times$, the multiplicative group of p-adic units. Since $\mathbb{Q}_p^\times$ is abelian, it has a unique parahoric subgroup, $\mathbb{Z}_p^\times$. The Moy–Prasad subgroups of $\mathbb{Z}_p^\times$ are the higher unit groups $U^{(r)}$, where for simplicity $r$ is a positive integer:
$$(\mathbb{Z}_p^\times)_r=1+(p\,\mathbb{Z}_p)^r = \{u\in\mathbb{Z}_p^\times:u\equiv1\bmod{p^r}\}.$$
The Lie algebra of $\mathbb{Q}_p^\times$ is $\mathbb{Q}_p$, and its Moy–Prasad subalgebras are the nonzero ideals of $\mathbb{Z}_p$:
$$(\mathbb{Z}_p)_r=(p\,\mathbb{Z}_p)^r = \{p^ra : a\in\mathbb{Z}_p\}.$$
More generally, if $r$ is a positive real number then we use the floor function to define the $r$th Moy–Prasad subgroup and subalgebra:
$$(\mathbb{Z}_p^\times)_r := (\mathbb{Z}_p^\times)_{\lfloor r\rfloor},\qquad(\mathbb{Z}_p)_r := (\mathbb{Z}_p)_{\lfloor r\rfloor}$$
This example illustrates the general phenomenon that although the Moy–Prasad filtration is indexed by the nonnegative real numbers, the filtration jumps only on a discrete, periodic subset, in this case, the natural numbers. In particular, it is usually the case that the $r$th and $s$th Moy–Prasad subgroups are equal if $s$ is only slightly larger than $r$.

=== General linear group ===
Another important example of a p-adic reductive group is the general linear group $\text{GL}_n(\mathbb{Q}_p)$; this example generalizes the previous one because $\text{GL}_1(\mathbb{Q}_p) = \mathbb{Q}_p^\times$. Since $\text{GL}_n(\mathbb{Q}_p)$ is nonabelian (when $n\geq2$), it has infinitely many parahoric subgroups. One particular parahoric subgroup is $\text{GL}_n(\mathbb{Z}_p)$. The Moy–Prasad subgroups of $\text{GL}_n(\mathbb{Z}_p)$ are the subgroups of elements equal to the identity matrix $1$ modulo high powers of $p$. Specifically, when $r$ is a positive integer we define
$$\text{GL}_n(\mathbb{Z}_p)_r=1+(p\,\text{M}_n(\mathbb{Z}_p))^r = \{u\in\text{M}_n(\mathbb{Z}_p):u\equiv1\bmod{p^r}\}.$$
where $\text{M}_n(\mathbb{Z}_p)$ is the algebra of n × n matrices with coefficients in $\mathbb{Z}_p$. The Lie algebra of $\text{GL}_n(\mathbb{Q}_p)$ is $\text{M}_n(\mathbb{Q}_p)$, and its Moy–Prasad subalgebras are the spaces of matrices equal to the zero matrix modulo high powers of $p$; when $r$ is a positive integer we define
$$\text{M}_n(\mathbb{Z}_p)_r=(p\,\text{M}_n(\mathbb{Z}_p))^r = \{u\in\text{M}_n(\mathbb{Z}_p):u\equiv0\bmod{p^r}\}.$$
Finally, as before, if $r$ is a positive real number then we use the floor function to define the $r$th Moy–Prasad subgroup and subalgebra:
$$\text{GL}_n(\mathbb{Z}_p)_r := \text{GL}_n(\mathbb{Z}_p)_{\lfloor r\rfloor},\qquad\text{M}_n(\mathbb{Z}_p)_r := \text{M}_n(\mathbb{Z}_p)_{\lfloor r\rfloor}$$
In this example, the Moy–Prasad groups would more commonly be denoted by $\text{GL}_n(\mathbb{Q}_p)_{x,r}$ instead of $\text{GL}_n(\mathbb{Z}_p)_r$, where $x$ is a point of the building of $\text{GL}_n(\mathbb{Q}_p)$ whose corresponding parahoric subgroup is $\text{GL}_n(\mathbb{Z}_p).$

== Properties ==
Although the Moy–Prasad filtration is commonly used to study the representation theory of p-adic groups, one can construct Moy–Prasad subgroups over any Henselian, discretely valued field $k$, not just over a nonarchimedean local field. In this and subsequent sections, we will therefore assume that the base field $k$ is Henselian and discretely valued, and with ring of integers $\mathcal{O}_k$. Nonetheless, the reader is welcome to assume for simplicity that $k=\mathbb{Q}_p$, so that $\mathcal{O}_k=\mathbb{Z}_p$.

Let $G$ be a reductive $k$-group, let $r\geq0$, and let $x$ be a point of the extended Bruhat-Tits building of $G$. The $r$th Moy–Prasad subgroup of $G(k)$ at $x$ is denoted by $G(k)_{x,r}$. Similarly, the $r$th Moy–Prasad Lie subalgebra of $\mathfrak{g}$ at $x$ is denoted by $\mathfrak{g}_{x,r}$; it is a free $\mathcal{O}_k$-module spanning $\mathfrak{g}_{x,r}$, or in other words, a lattice. (In fact, the Lie algebra $\mathfrak{g}_{x,r}$ can also be defined when $r<0$, though the group $G(k)_{x,r}$ cannot.)

Perhaps the most basic property of the Moy–Prasad filtration is that it is decreasing: if $r\leq s$ then $\mathfrak{g}_{x,r}\supseteq\mathfrak{g}_{x,s}$ and $G(k)_{x,r}\supseteq G(k)_{x,s}$. It is standard to then define the subgroup and subalgebra
$$G(k)_{x,r+}:=\bigcup_{s>r} G(k)_{x,s},
\qquad
\mathfrak{g}_{x,r+}:=\bigcup_{s>r} \mathfrak{g}_{x,s}.$$
This convention is just a notational shortcut because for any $r$, there is an $\varepsilon>0$ such that $\mathfrak{g}_{x,r+}=\mathfrak{g}_{x,r+\varepsilon}$ and $G(k)_{x,r+}=G(k)_{x,r+\varepsilon}$.

The Moy–Prasad filtration satisfies the following additional properties.

- A jump in the Moy–Prasad filtration is defined as an index (that is, nonnegative real number) $r$ such that $G(k)_{x,r+}\neq G(k)_{x,r}$. The set of jumps is discrete and countably infinite.
- If $r\leq s$ then $G(k)_{x,s}$ is a normal subgroup of $G(k)_{x,r}$ and $\mathfrak{g}_{x,s}$ is an ideal of $\mathfrak{g}_{x,r}$. It is a notational convention in the subject to write $G(k)_{x,r:s}:=G(k)_{x,r}/G(k)_{x,s}$ and $\mathfrak{g}_{x,r:s}:=\mathfrak{g}_{x,r}/\mathfrak{g}_{x,s}$ for the associated quotients.
- The quotient $G(k)_{x,0:0+}$ is a reductive group over the residue field of $\mathcal{O}_k$, namely, the maximal reductive quotient of the special fiber of the $\mathcal{O}_k$-group underlying the parahoric $G(k)_{x,0}$. In particular, if $k$ is a nonarchimedean local field (such as $\mathbb{Q}_p$) then this quotient is a finite group of Lie type.
- $[G(k)_{x,r},G(k)_{x,s}]\subseteq G(k)_{x,r+s}$ and $[\mathfrak{g}_{x,r},\mathfrak{g}_{x,s}]\subseteq\mathfrak{g}_{x,r+s}$; here the first bracket is the commutator and the second is the Lie bracket.
- For any automorphism $\theta$ of $G$ we have $\theta(G(k)_{x,r})=G(k)_{\theta(x),r}$ and $\text{d}\theta(\mathfrak{g}_{x,r}) = \mathfrak{g}_{\theta(x),r}$, where $\text{d}\theta$ is the derivative of $\theta$.
- For any uniformizer $\varpi$ of $k$ we have $\varpi\mathfrak{g}_{x,r}=\mathfrak{g}_{x,r+1}$.

Under certain technical assumptions on $G$, an additional important property is satisfied. By the commutator subgroup property, the quotient $G(k)_{x,r:s}$ is abelian if $r\leq s\leq 2r$. In this case there is a canonical isomorphism $\mathfrak{g}_{x,r:s}\cong G(k)_{x,r:s}$, called the Moy–Prasad isomorphism. The technical assumption needed for the Moy–Prasad isomorphism to exist is that $G$ be tame, meaning that $G$ splits over a tamely ramified extension of the base field $k$. If this assumption is violated then $\mathfrak{g}_{x,r:s}$ and $G(k)_{x,r:s}$ are not necessarily isomorphic.

== Depth of a representation ==
The Moy–Prasad can be used to define an important numerical invariant of a smooth representation $(\pi,V)$ of $G(k)$, the depth of the representation: this is the smallest number $r$ such that for some point $x$ in the building of $G$, there is a nonzero vector of $V$ fixed by $G(k)_{x,r+}$.

In a sequel to the paper defining their filtration, Moy and Prasad proved a structure theorem for depth-zero supercuspidal representations. Let $x$ be a point in a minimal facet of the building of $G$; that is, the parahoric subgroup $G(k)_{x,0}$ is a maximal parahoric subgroup. The quotient $G(k)_{x,0:0+}$ is a finite group of Lie type. Let $\tau$ be the inflation to $G(k)_{x,0}$ of a representation of this quotient that is cuspidal in the sense of Harish-Chandra (see also Deligne–Lusztig theory). The stabilizer $G(k)_x$ of $x$ in $G(k)$ contains the parahoric group $G(k)_{x,0}$ as a finite-index normal subgroup. Let $\rho$ be an irreducible representation of $G(k)_x$ whose restriction to $G(k)_{x,0}$ contains $\tau$ as a subrepresentation. Then the compact induction of $\rho$ to $G(k)$ is a depth-zero supercuspidal representation. Moreover, every depth-zero supercuspidal representation is isomorphic to one of this form.

In the tame case, the local Langlands correspondence is expected to preserve depth, where the depth of an L-parameter is defined using the upper numbering filtration on the Weil group.

== Construction ==
Although we defined $x$ to lie in the extended building of $G$, it turns out that the Moy–Prasad subgroup $G(k)_{x,r}$ depends only on the image of $x$ in the reduced building, so that nothing is lost by thinking of $x$ as a point in the reduced building.

Our description of the construction follows Yu's article on smooth models.

=== Tori ===
Since algebraic tori are a particular class of reductive groups, the theory of the Moy–Prasad filtration applies to them as well. It turns out, however, that the construction of the Moy–Prasad subgroups for a general reductive group relies on the construction for tori, so we begin by discussing the case where $G=T$ is a torus. Since the reduced building of a torus is a point there is only one choice for $x$, and so we will suppress $x$ from the notation and write $T(k)_r:=T(k)_{x,r}$.

First, consider the special case where $T$ is the Weil restriction of $\mathbb{G}_\text{m}$ along a finite separable extension $\ell$ of $k$, so that $T(k)=\ell^\times$. In this case, we define $T(k)_r$ as the set of $a\in\ell^\times$ such that $\text{val}_k(x-1)\geq r$, where $\text{val}_k:\ell\to\mathbb{R}$ is the unique extension of the valuation of $k$ to $\ell$.

A torus is said to be induced if it is the direct product of finitely many tori of the form considered in the previous paragraph. The $r$th Moy–Prasad subgroup of an induced torus is defined as the product of the $r$th Moy–Prasad subgroup of these factors.

Second, consider the case where $r=0$ but $T$ is an arbitrary torus. Here the Moy–Prasad subgroup $T(k)_0$ is defined as the integral points of the Néron lft-model of $T$. This definition agrees with the previously given one when $T$ is an induced torus.

It turns out that every torus can be embedded in an induced torus. To define the Moy–Prasad subgroups of a general torus $T$, then, we choose an embedding of $T$ in an induced torus $S$ and define $T(k)_r:=T(k)_0\cap S(k)_r$. This construction is independent of the choice of induced torus and embedding.

=== Reductive groups ===
For simplicity, we will first outline the construction of the Moy–Prasad subgroup $G(k)_{x,r}$ in the case where $G$ is split. After, we will comment on the general definition.

Let $T$ be a maximal split torus of $G$ whose apartment contains $x$, and let $\Phi$ be the root system of $G$ with respect to $T$.

For each $\alpha\in\Phi$, let $U_\alpha$ be the root subgroup of $G$ with respect to $\alpha$. As an abstract group $U_\alpha$ is isomorphic to $\mathbb{G}_\text{a}$, though there is no canonical isomorphism. The point $x$ determines, for each root $\alpha$, an additive valuation $v_{\alpha,x}:U_\alpha(k)\to\mathbb{R}$. We define $U_\alpha(k)_{x,r}:=\{u\in U_\alpha(k) : v_{\alpha,x}(u)\geq r\}$.

Finally, the Moy–Prasad subgroup $G(k)_{x,r}$ is defined as the subgroup of $G(k)$ generated by the subgroups $U_\alpha(k)_{x,r}$ for $\alpha\in\Phi$ and the subgroup $T(k)_r$.

If $G$ is not split, then the Moy–Prasad subgroup $G(k)_{x,r}$ is defined by unramified descent from the quasi-split case, a standard trick in Bruhat–Tits theory. More specifically, one first generalizes the definition of the Moy–Prasad subgroups given above, which applies when $G$ is split, to the case where $G$ is only quasi-split, using the relative root system. From here, the Moy–Prasad subgroup can be defined for an arbitrary $G$ by passing to the maximal unramified extension $k^\text{nr}$ of $k$, a field over which every reductive group, and in particular $G$, is quasi-split, and then taking the fixed points of this Moy–Prasad group under the Galois group of $k^\text{nr}$ over $k$.

=== Group schemes ===
The $k$-group $G$ carries much more structure than the group $G(k)$ of rational points: the former is an algebraic variety whereas the second is only an abstract group. For this reason, there are many technical advantages to working not only with the abstract group $G(k)$, but also the variety $G(k)$. Similarly, although we described $G(k)_{x,r}$ as an abstract group, a certain subgroup of $G(k)$, it is desirable for $G(k)_{x,r}$ to be the group of integral points of a group scheme $G_{x,r}$ defined over the ring of integers, so that $G(k)_{x,r}=G_{x,r}(\mathcal{O}_k)$. In fact, it is possible to construct such a group scheme $G_{x,r}$.

=== Lie algebras ===
Let $\mathfrak{g}$ be the Lie algebra of $G$. In a similar procedure as for reductive groups, namely, by defining Moy–Prasad filtrations on the Lie algebra of a torus and the Lie algebra of a root group, one can define the Moy–Prasad Lie algebras $\mathfrak{g}_{x,r}$ of $\mathfrak{g}$; they are free $\mathcal{O}_k$-modules, that is, $\mathcal{O}_k$-lattices in the $k$-vector space $\mathfrak{g}$. When $r\geq0$, it turns out that $\mathfrak{g}_{x,r}$ is just the Lie algebra of the $\mathcal{O}_k$-group scheme $G_{x,r}$.

=== Indexing set ===
We have defined the Moy–Prasad filtration at the point $x$ to be indexed by the set $\mathbb{R}$ of real numbers. It is common in the subject to extend the indexing set slightly, to the set $\widetilde{\mathbb{R}}$ consisting of $\mathbb{R}$ and formal symbols $r+$ with $r\in\mathbb{R}$. The element $r+$ is thought of as being infinitesimally larger than $r$, and the filtration is extended to this case by defining $G(k)_{x,r+}:=\bigcup_{s>r}G(k)_{x,s}$. Since the valuation on $k$ is discrete, there is $\varepsilon>0$ such that $G(k)_{x,r+}=G(k)_{x,r+\varepsilon}$.

== See also ==
- Congruence subgroup
