= Ila Fiete =

American physicist

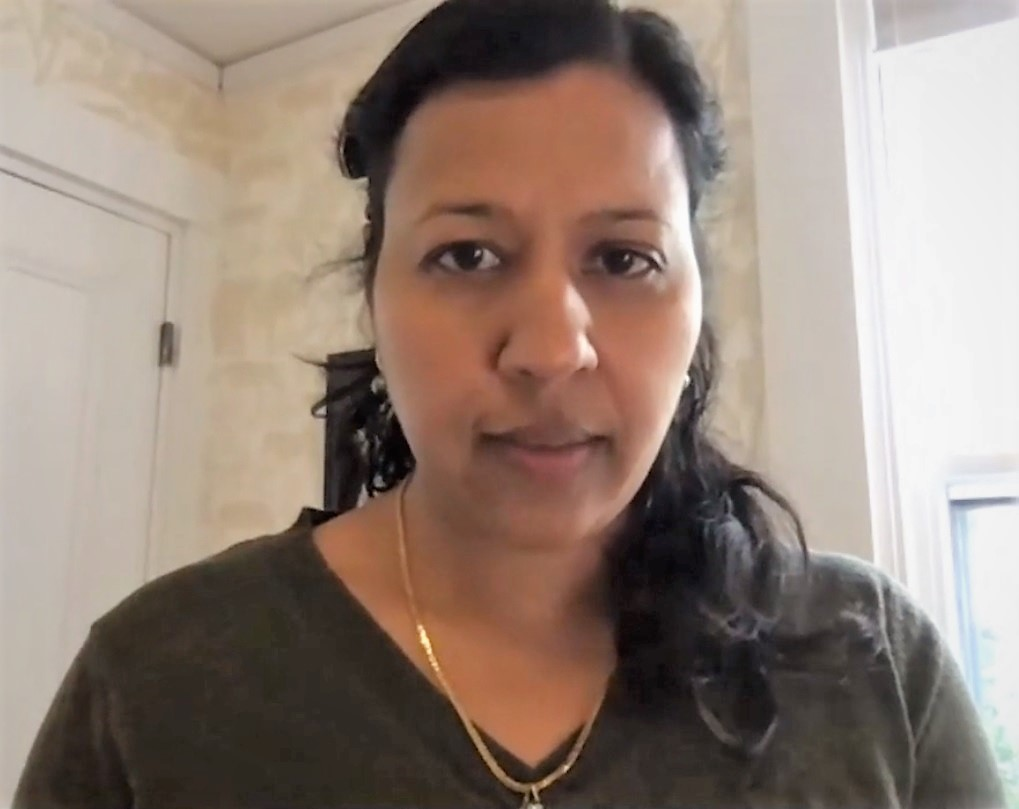
- Fiete speaks to the Okinawa Institute of Science and Technology in 2020
- Born: Mumbai, India
- Education: B.S. University of Michigan, M.A. and Ph.D. Harvard University
- Known for: Modelling neural computations that underlie short-term memory, integration, and inference
- Awards: 2017 CIFAR Senior Fellow; 2016 Howard Hughes Faculty Scholar; 2013 CNS Excellence Award for Teaching - College of Natural Sciences University of Texas at Austin; 2011–2013 McKnight Scholar; 2013 Office of Naval Research Young Investigator; 2010 Searle Scholar; 2009 Alfred P. Sloan Foundation Fellow in Neuroscience
- Scientific career
- Fields: Physics and computational neuroscience
- Workplaces: McGovern Institute at the Massachusetts Institute of Technology
- Thesis: Learning and coding in biological neural networks (2004)
- Doctoral advisor: Sebastian Seung

Ila Fiete is an Indian–American physicist and computational neuroscientist as well as a Professor in the Department of Brain and Cognitive Sciences within the McGovern Institute for Brain Research at the Massachusetts Institute of Technology. Fiete builds theoretical models and analyses neural data and to uncover how neural circuits perform computations and how the brain represents and manipulates information involved in memory and reasoning.

== Early life and education ==
Fiete was born in Mumbai, India. Her parents, Gopal Prasad and Indu Devi, moved to Michigan in 1992. She pursued her undergraduate studies at the University of Michigan, majoring in mathematics and physics. Fiete then moved to Boston to pursue her master's degree and graduate studies at Harvard University in the Department of Physics. Fiete was mentored in computational neuroscience by Sebastian Seung at MIT and in physics by Daniel Fisher at Harvard. In her graduate degree, Fiete explored the principles of learning and coding in biological neural networks. Fiete is married to Greg Fiete, Professor of Physics at Northeastern University. Her brother Anoop Prasad, trained as a theoretical physicist, is Managing Director and Head of the Equities Group at D.E. Shaw & Co.

Fiete completed her graduate studies in 2003, and moved across the country to hold an appointment as a postdoctoral fellow at the Kavli Institute for Theoretical Physics at the University of California, Santa Barbara from 2004 until 2006. During this time, Fiete was also a visiting member of the Center for Theoretical Biophysics at the University of California, San Diego. From 2006 to 2008, Fiete served as a Broad Fellow in Brain Circuitry at Caltech under the mentorship of Christof Koch.

=== Graduate Work - Coding in Biological Neural Circuits ===
During her graduate studies, Fiete and her colleagues used linear networks of learning to show that sparse temporal neural codes minimize synaptic interference and facilitate learning in songbirds. Fiete then began to explore the computational principles underlying synaptic plasticity. She proposed a synaptic reinforcement rule to perform goal-directed learning in recurrent networks of rate-based and spiking neurons. The rule performs stochastic gradient ascent on the reward. Specifically, if the reward signal quantifies network performance then the plasticity rule is able to drive goal-directed learning in the network. Fiete applied her model to neurophysiological data of songbirds and found that the trial-and-error based learning rule was fast enough to explain learning in songbirds.

=== Grid Cells ===
When Fiete started her postdoctoral research, she began to study the coding principles of cells in the brain that encode location. In 2006, Fiete and her colleagues described a framework to understand the computations of grid cells in the entorhinal cortex, and how they encode the positions of rats. They showed that the representation is analogous to a residue number system, which allows a small number of cells to represent and update a rat's position over large distances or multiple environments. This hypothesis is very different from others of how coding is performed in the brain, and this "arithmetic-friendly" numeral system highlights the ingenuity of neural codes.

== Career and research ==
In 2008, Fiete joined the faculty at the University of Texas at Austin. While at UT Austin, Fiete made a significant impact on the community as both a researcher and an educator, receiving the 2013 CNS Excellence Award for Teaching from the College of Natural Sciences University of Texas, Austin. After serving on the faculty for 10 years and founding the Center for Theoretical and Computational Neuroscience there, in 2018 Fiete accepted an offer from the Massachusetts Institute of Technology and became an associate professor with tenure within the Department of Brain and Cognitive Sciences. In early 2019, Fiete joined the McGovern Institute at MIT as an Associate Investigator. In May 2020, Fiete was promoted to Full Professor in the Department of Brain and Cognitive Sciences at MIT. Fiete's research program is centered around understanding why the brain contains particular coding properties and how the connectivity and dynamics of neural circuits and synaptic plasticity underlie such coding principals. Her lab uses numerical and theoretical modelling as well as raw neural data with which to test their models of brain computations.

=== Grid Cell Computations ===
Fiete and her colleagues at UT Austin were interested in exploring the neural computations underlying grid cells in the entorhinal cortex. Grid cells are known to encode spatial location in mammals as they wander through the world. Fiete and her colleagues found that grid cell computations can emerge from a pattern formation process, and can be modelled by continuous attractor networks. With inputs signifying the velocity and heading direction of the animal, continuous attractor models can generate triangular grid responses that encode updated estimates of location in two-dimensional spaces. They further show, with a proof of concept, that continuous attractor dynamics underlie the integration of velocity in grid cells. In 2013, Fiete and her colleagues used in vivo neural recordings as the basis for their computational investigation of the mechanisms underlying grid cell activity. Their model, relying on low-dimensional continuous attractor dynamics, reliably characterized grid cell responses in short duration, familiar enclosures. Over time and in changing conditions, individual grid cell responses change however, the grid parameter ratios and relative phases between simultaneously recorded cells stay essentially constant, showing that population level responses are invariant. Their findings argue against the cell-environment hypothesis as they find that the stability of cell-cell responses is more robust than cell-environment responses.

The following year, Fiete described a model to explain grid cell development, from the moment of eye opening to fully developed grid cell computations. In the beginning, their model depicts initially unstructured networks of neurons spiking to velocity and location inputs. They propose, through computational modelling, that grid neurons develop an organized recurrent architecture based on the similarity of their inputs, acting through inhibitory neurons, and this lays the foundation for a mature grid cell network that can compute velocity and location in a coordinated and integrated fashion.

Fiete was then interested in developing a robust system with which to determine neural circuit mechanisms underlying brain function that do not merely rely on observing neural activity. Using the grid cell system, which Fiete had extensively probed and serves as a good system for testing computational models, Fiete showed that the "distribution of relative phase shifts" model has the potential to reveal highly detailed cortical circuit mechanisms from sparse neural recordings. Through the use of perturbative experiments, they find that their method is able to discriminate between feedforward and recurrent neural networks to uncover which model most accurately described neural computations.

In 2019, once Fiete had arrived at MIT, she published a paper using topological modeling to transform the neural activity of large populations of neurons into a data cloud representing the shape of a ring. This ring-like spatial representation of neural activity has been shown in flies to underlie head direction, and now, by Fiete, has been shown to represent head direction in mice - like an internal compass. The ring-like shape that the neural activity creates is known as a manifold in computational analyses, a shape represented in multiple dimensions to depict multidimensional data. Its shape and dimensionality represent the data in a more interpretable way. The approach that Fiete describes, using a manifold to depict neural activity, enables blind (unsupervised) discovery and decoding of external variables using only neural activity as an input.

== Awards and honors ==
- 2017 CIFAR Senior Fellow
- 2016 Howard Hughes Faculty Scholar
- 2013 CNS Excellence Award for Teaching - College of Natural Sciences University of Texas at Austin
- 2011-2013 McKnight Scholar
- 2013 Office of Naval Research Young Investigator
- 2010 Searle Scholar
- 2009 Alfred P. Sloan Foundation Fellow in Neuroscience
