= Ian Sloan (mathematician) =

Australian mathematician (born 1938)

- Born: 17 June 1938 (age 88); Melbourne, Australia
- Education: University of Melbourne; University of Adelaide; University College London
- Awards: AO; ANZIAM Medal; George Szekeres Medal
- Scientific career
- Fields: Theoretical physics; Numerical analysis; Numerical Integration
- Workplaces: University of New South Wales
- Doctoral advisor: Sir Harrie Massey

Ian Hugh Sloan AO FAA FRSN (born 17 June 1938) is an Australian applied mathematician.

== Early life ==
Sloan was born on 17 June, 1938, in Melbourne, Australia. His father, originally trained as a civil engineer, became a senior mathematics teacher and housemaster at Scotch College, Melbourne after losing his job during the Great Depression. Sloan has an older brother, Charles. At age 6, his father was appointed as Principal of Ballarat College, and so he moved from Scotch College to Ballarat College, where he spent most of his school years.

== Education ==
Sloan's inspiration to study science and mathematics is drawn from his father who was a mathematics teacher.

After attending Scotch College and Ballarat College, he graduated from the University of Melbourne with a Bachelor of Science (BSc) in 1958 and a Bachelor of Arts (BA) with Honours in 1960. He subsequently earned a Master of Science (MSc) in mathematical physics from the University of Adelaide. Sloan then completed a Phd in theoretical physics at University College London under the supervision of Sir Harrie Massey, while working as a research scientist for the Colonial Sugar Refining from 1961 until 1965.

== Career ==
In 1964, Sloan returned to Australia and subsequently joined the University of New South Wales (UNSW) in 1965 as Lecturer. He was promoted to Senior Lecturer in 1968, Associate Professor in 1973 and then to Scientia Professor in 1999. He was appointed to Personal Chair in Mathematics in 1983 before serving as the Head of the School of Mathematics from 1986 to 1990 and from 1992 to 1993. He is now an Emeritus and part-time professor at UNSW.

His early work was in theoretical nuclear physics, but he moved to applied mathematics, especially numerical analysis. Sloan has published more than 280 papers covering areas such as the numerical solution of integral equations, numerical integration and interpolation, boundary integral equations, approximation theory, multiple integration, continuous complexity theory and other parts of numerical analysis and approximation theory. He has made important contributions to the theory of numerical integration in many dimensions, in recent years concentrating on quasi-Monte Carlo methods. The Bencze-Redish-Sloan equation and the Sloan iteration for integral equations are named after him.

He has had many visiting positions including at Cornell University, Erwin Schrödinger International Institute for Mathematics and Physics, Hong Kong Polytechnic University, King Fahd University of Petroleum and Minerals, Mittag-Leffler Institute, Isaac Newton Institute, Polytechnic University of Milan, TU Wien, University of Bath, University of Stuttgart, Weierstrass Institute and the University of Maryland, where he completed two sabbaticals.

Sloan has been a member of the editorial board of a number of journals including the SIAM Journal on Numerical Analysis, Numerische Mathematik, Advances in Computational Mathematics, Journal of Integral Equations and Applications, the International Journal of Geomathematics, Foundations of Computational Mathematics, Computational Methods in Applied Mathematics, the Chinese Journal of Engineering Mathematics, International Journal for Mathematics in Industry and the Journal of Complexity.

Between 1998 and 2000, he served as the President of the Australian Mathematical Society. From 2003 to 2007, he was president of the International Council for Industrial and Applied Mathematics (ICIAM). After serving as Vice-President and President-elect between 2017 and 2018, Sloan became President of the Royal Society of New South Wales between 2018 and 2020, taking over from Brynn Hibbert.

== Personal life ==
Sloan is married to Jan Sloan, who he met while studying at the University of Melbourne. They have two children, a daughter and a son.

== Awards and honours ==
- In 1993 he was elected a Fellow of the Australian Academy of Science
- In 1997, he was awarded the ANZIAM Medal of the Australian Mathematical Society.
- In 2001, he was awarded the Australian Academy of Science's Thomas Ranken Lyle Medal.
- In 2001, he was awarded the Centenary Medal "for service to Australian society and science mathematics"
- In 2002, he shared the inaugural George Szekeres Medal of the Australian Mathematical Society with Alf van der Poorten of Macquarie University.
- In the June 2008 Queen's Birthday Honours, he was appointed an Officer of the Order of Australia (AO) for "service to education through the study of mathematics, particularly in the field of computational mathematics, as an academic, researcher and mentor, and to a range of national and international professional associations."
- In 2009, he became Fellow of the Society for Industrial and Applied Mathematics
- In 2012 he became a fellow of the American Mathematical Society.
- In 2014 he was elected a Fellow of the Royal Society of New South Wales (FRSN).
- In 2018, he received an Honorary Doctorate from UNSW.
- In 2023, he was elected as a Distinguished Fellow of the Royal Society of New South Wales.

== Selected publications ==
- Sloan, I. H. (1994). Lattice methods for multiple integration. S. Joe. Oxford: Clarendon Press. ISBN 0-19-853472-8. OCLC 30979041.
- Sloan, Ian H; Woźniakowski, Henryk (1 March 1998). "When Are Quasi-Monte Carlo Algorithms Efficient for High Dimensional Integrals?". Journal of Complexity. 14 (1): 1–33. doi:10.1006/jcom.1997.0463. ISSN 0885-064X.
- Dick, Josef; Kuo, Frances Y.; Sloan, Ian H. (May 2013). "High-dimensional integration: The quasi-Monte Carlo way". Acta Numerica. 22: 133–288. Bibcode:2013AcNum..22..133D. doi:10.1017/S0962492913000044. ISSN 0962-4929. S2CID 119518174.
- Sloan, Ian H.; Womersley, Robert S. (1 July 2004). "Extremal Systems of Points and Numerical Integration on the Sphere". Advances in Computational Mathematics. 21 (1): 107–125. Bibcode:2004AdCoM..21..107S. doi:10.1023/B:ACOM.0000016428.25905.da. ISSN 1572-9044. S2CID 12961424.
- YAN, Y.; SLOAN, I.H. (1988). "On Integral Equations of the First Kind with Logarithmic Kernels". The Journal of Integral Equations and Applications. 1 (4): 549–579. doi:10.1216/JIE-1988-1-4-549. ISSN 0897-3962. JSTOR 26162851.
- Kuo, Frances Y.; Schwab, Christoph; Sloan, Ian H. (1 January 2012). "Quasi-Monte Carlo Finite Element Methods for a Class of Elliptic Partial Differential Equations with Random Coefficients". SIAM Journal on Numerical Analysis. 50 (6): 3351–3374. doi:10.1137/110845537. hdl:20.500.11850/154997. ISSN 0036-1429. S2CID 1208726.
- Sloan, Ian H. (1 May 1985). "Lattice methods for multiple integration". Journal of Computational and Applied Mathematics. 12–13: 131–143. doi:10.1016/0377-0427(85)90012-3. ISSN 0377-0427.
