= George Szekeres Medal =

Australian Mathematical Society award

The George Szekeres Medal is awarded by the Australian Mathematical Society for outstanding research contributions over a fifteen-year period. This award, established in 2001, was given biennially in even-numbered years until 2021 and has since been given annually, for work that has been carried out primarily in Australia.

This medal commemorates the work of the late George Szekeres, FAA, for his achievements in number theory, combinatorics, analysis, and relativity.

== Winners ==
Year	Winner	Affiliation	Notes
2025	Enrico Valdinoci	University of Western Australia	
2024	Susan M. Scott	Australian National University	
2023	George A. Willis	University of Newcastle	
2022	Igor Shparlinski	University of New South Wales	
2021	Mathai Varghese	University of Adelaide	
2020	Nalini Joshi	University of Sydney	
2020	Ole Warnaar	University of Queensland	
2018	Peter Taylor	University of Melbourne	
2016	Jim Hill	University of Adelaide	
2016	Gus Lehrer	University of Sydney	
2014	Cheryl Praeger	University of Western Australia	
2012	Ross Street	Macquarie University	
2012	Neil Trudinger	Australian National University	
2010	Peter Hall	University of Melbourne	
2008	J. Hyam Rubinstein	University of Melbourne	
2006	Anthony J. Guttmann	University of Melbourne	
2004	Robert S. Anderssen	CSIRO Canberra	
2002	Ian Sloan	University of New South Wales	
2002	Alf van der Poorten	Macquarie University	

== See also ==
- List of mathematics awards
