= George A. Willis =

Australian mathematician

George A. Willis FAA
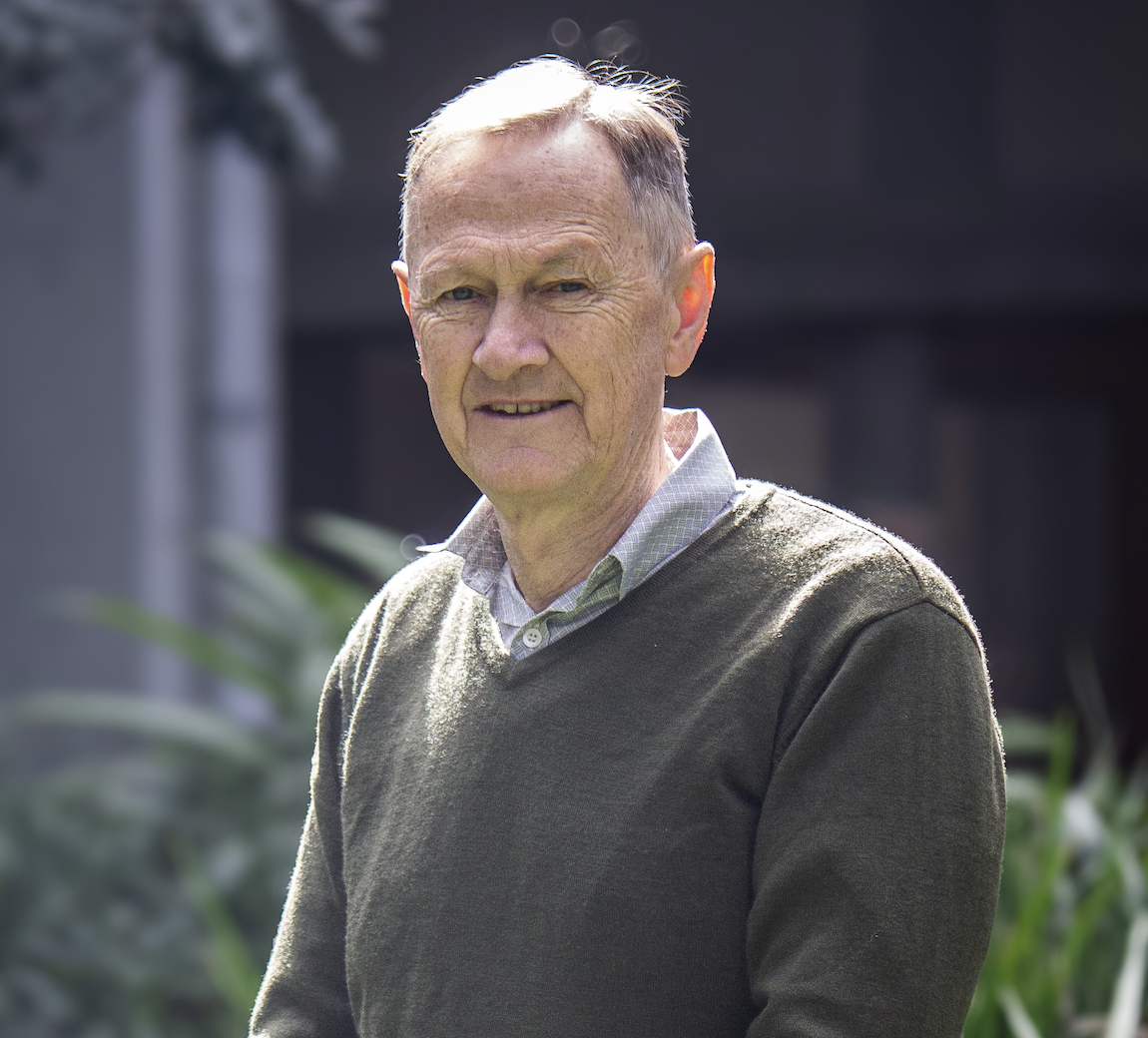
- Willis at the University of Newcastle, NSW
- Born: 10 November 1954 (age 71); Adelaide, South Australia, Australia

Academic background
- Education: University of Newcastle upon Tyne

Academic work
- Discipline: Mathematics
- Sub-discipline: group theory; topological algebra; harmonic analysis
- Institutions: University of Newcastle (Australia)

George A. Willis FAA (born 10 November 1954) is an Australian mathematician. Willis received BSc (1976) and BSc (Hons) degrees in mathematics from the University of Adelaide (1977), and a doctorate from the University of Newcastle upon Tyne (1981) under the supervision of Professor B. E. Johnson. He is currently emeritus Professor of Mathematics at the University of Newcastle (Australia). He is best known for his works in group theory, particularly totally disconnected groups.

== Career ==
Willis' career has been largely spent in regional Australia at the University of Newcastle (Australia). He was appointed full Professor as well as ARC Professorial Fellow in 2009, and ARC Laureate Fellow in 2018.

After the conferral of his doctorate degree from the University of Newcastle upon Tyne in 1981, he returned to Australia and took up a position as the Rothman's Postdoctoral Fellow at the University of New South Wales. From 1983 to 1985 he worked at the University of Halifax, Nova Scotia, as the Killam Postdoctoral Fellow, and then returned again to Australia as a Queen Elizabeth II Fellow at the University of Adelaide, before beginning a lectureship at Flinders University of South Australia in 1987. Willis then moved to the Australian National University as a research fellow in 1989, before finally moving to the University of Newcastle (Australia) to take up a lectureship where he is now emeritus Professor.

During his career he has published widely and has advised 14 PhD students (as of April 2023).

He was Editor-in-Chief of the Journal of the Australian Mathematical Society (Cambridge University Press) from 2012 to 2019.

== Research ==
Willis' first research paper was published in 1982 based on his research for his doctoral thesis. Willis' early research was centered around functional analysis and harmonic analysis, before shifting into group theory, particularly totally disconnected locally compact (TDLC) groups and the interaction between algebra and topology. Major areas and results include:

- Willis' general structural results for totally disconnected locally compact groups paved the way to an understanding of these groups that had remained intractable for 60 years. Out of this body of work came what is now known as "Willis' Theory", a "whole new insight" into the structure and classification of totally disconnected locally compact groups.
- In October 2014 an Arbeitsgemeinschaft was held in Oberwolfach dedicated to research on totally disconnected groups.
- Willis showed that factorisation in Banach and group algebra is possible in cases when the Cohen factorisation theorem does not apply, and decisively closed the argument using negative counterexamples.
- Willis and Yehuda Shalom co-authored a paper that answered the conjecture of Margulis and Zimmer for a broad class of groups, and provided a unified framework for considering a number of results and conjectures in the rigidity theory of arithmetic groups. This paper won Willis the 2016 Gavin Brown Prize.
- Willis and Udo Baumgartner began describing contraction groups in 2004, by proving the theorem that if the scale is not 1 then the contraction subgroup is not trivial.
- Willis and Helge Glöckner, in the culmination of almost 20 years of work, arrived at a complete description of the closed contraction groups.

== Awards, honours, and memberships ==
Willis is a Fellow of the Australian Academy of Science, and a member of the Australian Mathematical Society, American Mathematical Society, and the London Mathematical Society.

- Thomas Ranken Lyle Medal, 2025
- George Szekeres Medal, 2023
- Humboldt Research Award, 2023
- Invited plenary speaker, International Congress of Mathematicians, 2022
- Australian Laureate Fellowship (Australian Research Council) 2017
- Fellow of the Royal Society of New South Wales 2018
- Gavin Brown Prize (Australian Mathematical Society) 2016
- Fellow of the Australian Academy of Science 2014
- Invited plenary speaker, Australian Mathematical Society Annual Meeting 2011
- Professorial Fellow (Australian Research Council) 2009
- Invited speaker, British Mathematical Colloquium 2003

== Notable publications ==
- Willis, G. (1994). "The structure of totally disconnected locally compact groups". Mathematische Annalen. 300: 341–363. doi:10.1007/BF01450491. S2CID 120442216.
- Shalom, Yehuda; Willis, George A. (2013). "Commensurated Subgroups of Arithmetic Groups, Totally Disconnected Groups and Adelic Rigidity". Geometric and Functional Analysis. 23 (5): 1631–1683. arXiv:0911.1966. doi:10.1007/s00039-013-0236-5. S2CID 253644791.
- Praeger, Cheryl E.; Ramagge, Jacqui; Willis, George A. (2020). "A graph-theoretic description of scale-multiplicative semigroups of automorphisms". Israel Journal of Mathematics. 237: 221–265. arXiv:1710.00439. doi:10.1007/s11856-020-2005-0. S2CID 255434569.
- Glöckner, Helge; Willis, George A. (2021). "Locally pro-p contraction groups are nilpotent". Journal für die reine und angewandte Mathematik. 2021 (781): 85–103. arXiv:2006.10999. doi:10.1515/crelle-2021-0050. S2CID 219956769.
