= Vinay V. Deodhar =

Indian mathematician (1948–2015)

Vinay Vithal Deodhar (3 December 1948 – 18 January 2015) was a Professor Emeritus in the Department of Mathematics at Indiana University. He worked in the area of algebraic groups and representation theory.

== Early life ==
Deodhar was born in Mumbai (Bombay), India in 1948.

== Career ==
Deodhar earned his Ph.D. from the University of Mumbai in 1974 for his work On Central Extensions of Rational Points of Algebraic Groups done under the supervision of M. S. Raghunathan.

After his doctorate, he was invited to join the School of Mathematics of the Tata Institute of Fundamental Research. Simultaneously he was a visiting scholar at the Institute for Advanced Study (IAS) in Princeton during 1975-77 and then a visiting professor at the Australian National University in Canberra. In 1981 he was appointed to a professorship at Indiana University, Bloomington, Indiana, where he remained until his death in 2015. He spent a further period as a visiting scholar at the IAS in 1992-93.
