= Hilbert–Smith conjecture =

Conjecture in topology

In mathematics, the Hilbert–Smith conjecture is concerned with the possible transformation groups of manifolds. The conjecture says that if a locally compact topological group G acts faithfully and continuous on a connected manifold M, then G must be a Lie group.

The naming of the conjecture is for David Hilbert, and Paul A. Smith. It is considered by some to be a better formulation of Hilbert's fifth problem, than the characterisation of topological groups being also a topological manifolds as Lie groups often cited as a solution.

== Results ==
Because of known structural results on G, it is enough to deal with the case where G is the additive group $\Z_p$ of p-adic integers, for some prime number p. An equivalent form of the conjecture is that $\Z_p$ has no faithful group action on a topological manifold.

In 1997, Dušan Repovš and Evgenij Ščepin proved the Hilbert–Smith conjecture for groups acting by Lipschitz maps on a Riemannian manifold using covering, fractal, and cohomological dimension theory.

In 1999, Gaven Martin extended their dimension-theoretic argument to quasiconformal actions on a Riemannian manifold and gave applications concerning unique analytic continuation for Beltrami systems.

In 2013, John Pardon proved the three-dimensional case of the Hilbert–Smith conjecture. The proof proceeds by finding a compact invariant set that "looks like a handlebody of genus two", and on which the group acts nontrivially on the cohomology. From this set, one gets a surface which is in some sense the "approximate boundary" of the first invariant set. Then one gets a certain cyclic subgroup of the mapping class group of this surface, contradicting a theorem of Jakob Nielsen.

In October 2026, a bulk release by OpenAI included a manuscript that claims, "We prove the Hilbert–Smith conjecture in every finite dimension". A separate proof in Lean was registered in the Palomar Registry.
