= Totally disconnected group =

In mathematics, a totally disconnected group is a topological group that is totally disconnected. Such topological groups are necessarily Hausdorff.

Interest centres on locally compact totally disconnected groups (variously referred to as groups of td-type, locally profinite groups, or t.d. groups). The compact case has been heavily studied – these are the profinite groups – but for a long time not much was known about the general case. A theorem of van Dantzig from the 1930s, stating that every such group contains a compact open subgroup, was all that was known. Then groundbreaking work by George Willis in 1994, opened up the field by showing that every locally compact totally disconnected group contains a so-called tidy subgroup and a special function on its automorphisms, the scale function, giving a quantifiable parameter for the local structure. Advances on the global structure of totally disconnected groups were obtained in 2011 by Caprace and Monod, with notably a classification of characteristically simple groups and of Noetherian groups.

== Locally compact case ==
In a locally compact, totally disconnected group, every neighbourhood of the identity contains a compact open subgroup. Conversely, if a group is such that the identity has a neighbourhood basis consisting of compact open subgroups, then it is locally compact and totally disconnected.

=== Tidy subgroups ===
Let G be a locally compact, totally disconnected group, U a compact open subgroup of G and $\alpha$ a continuous automorphism of G.

Define:

$$U_{+}=\bigcap_{n\ge 0}\alpha^n(U)$$
$$U_{-}=\bigcap_{n\ge 0}\alpha^{-n}(U)$$
$$U_{++}=\bigcup_{n\ge 0}\alpha^n(U_{+})$$
$$U_{--}=\bigcup_{n\ge 0}\alpha^{-n}(U_{-})$$

U is said to be tidy for $\alpha$ if and only if $U=U_{+}U_{-}=U_{-}U_{+}$ and $U_{++}$ and $U_{--}$ are closed.

=== The scale function ===
The index of $U_{+}$ in $\alpha(U_{+})$ is shown to be finite and independent of the compact open subgroup U which is tidy for $\alpha$. Defining the scale $s(\alpha)$ of the continuous automorphism $\alpha$ to be this index, we obtain the scale function $s:\mathrm{Aut}(G)\to\mathbb{N}$. Restricting $s$ to inner automorphisms by setting $s(x):=s(\alpha_{x})$ for a given element $x\in G$ with associated inner automorphism $\alpha_{x}$ results in a function $s:G\to\mathbb{N}$ with the following interesting properties.

==== Properties ====
- $s$ is continuous for the discrete topology on $\mathbb{N}$.
- $s(x)=1$, whenever x in G is a compact element.
- $s(x^n)=s(x)^n$ for every non-negative integer $n$.
- The modular function on G is given by $\Delta(x)=s(x)s(x^{-1})^{-1}$.

=== Calculations and applications ===
The scale function was used to prove a conjecture by Hofmann and Mukherja and has been explicitly calculated for p-adic Lie groups and linear groups over local skew fields by Helge Glöckner.
