= Leo Zippin =

American mathematician (1905–1995)

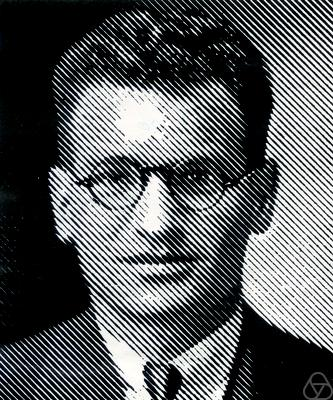
Leo Zippin

Leo Zippin (January 25, 1905 – May 11, 1995) was an American mathematician. He is best known for solving Hilbert's Fifth Problem with Deane Montgomery and Andrew M. Gleason in 1952.

== Biography ==
Leo Zippin was born in 1905 to Bella Salwen and Max Zippin, who had emigrated to New York City from Ukraine in 1903. He did his undergraduate and graduate work at the University of Pennsylvania in 1929. His doctoral adviser was John Robert Kline.

Leo Zippin is the author of The Uses Of Infinity, and together with Deane Montgomery, the monograph Topological Transformation Groups. In 1952, he, along with Andrew M. Gleason and Deane Montgomery solved Hilbert's fifth problem.

== Personal life ==
He married Frances Levinson in 1932. They had two children, Nina, a prominent literary critic and literary historian, and Vivian. He taught at Queens College in Flushing, NY.
