= Walter Lewis Baily Jr. =

American mathematician (1930–2013)

- Born: July 5, 1930; Waynesburg, Pennsylvania, U.S.
- Died: January 15, 2013 (aged 82); Northbrook, Illinois, U.S.
- Education: Massachusetts Institute of Technology (BS); Princeton University (MS, PhD)
- Known for: Baily–Borel compactification
- Scientific career
- Fields: Mathematics
- Workplaces: University of Chicago; Massachusetts Institute of Technology; Princeton University
- Doctoral advisor: Kunihiko Kodaira
- Doctoral students: Paul Monsky, Timothy J. Hickey, Daniel Bump

Walter Lewis Baily Jr. (July 5, 1930 – January 15, 2013) was an American mathematician.

== Life and career ==
Born in Waynesburg, Pennsylvania, Baily's research focused on areas of algebraic groups, modular forms and number-theoretical applications of automorphic forms. One of his significant works was with Armand Borel, now known as the Baily–Borel compactification, which is a compactification of a quotient of a Hermitian symmetric space by an arithmetic group (that is, a linear algebraic group over the rational numbers). Baily and Borel built on the work of Ichirō Satake and others.

Baily became a Putnam Fellow in 1952. He studied at the Massachusetts Institute of Technology (MIT), receiving a Bachelor of Science in Mathematics in 1952. After that, he attended Princeton University, receiving a Masters in 1953 and a Ph.D. in Mathematics in 1955 under the direction of his thesis advisor Kunihiko Kodaira (On the Quotient of a Complex Analytic Manifold by a Discontinuous Group of Complex Analytic Self-Homomorphisms). Subsequently, he was an instructor at Princeton and then MIT. In 1957 he worked as a mathematician at Bell Laboratories. In 1957, he was appointed Assistant Professor and subsequently promoted to Professor in 1963 at the University of Chicago. He became a Professor Emeritus at the University of Chicago in 2005.

He was a member of the American Mathematical Society and the Mathematical Society of Japan. He often visited the University of Tokyo as a guest of Shokichi Iyanaga and Kunihiko Kodaira, spoke fluent Japanese and in Tokyo, 1963 married Yaeko Iseki, with whom he had a son. He owned an apartment in Tokyo for many years, where he spent his summers. In addition, he often visited Moscow and Saint Petersburg and spoke fluent Russian.

He was awarded an Alfred P. Sloan Fellowship in 1958. In 1962, he was an invited speaker at the International Congress of Mathematicians held in Stockholm (On the moduli of Abelian varieties with multiplications from an order in a totally real number field).

His doctoral students include Paul Monsky, Timothy J. Hickey, and Daniel Bump.

Baily died in Northbrook, Illinois, at 82.

== Bibliography ==
- Baily, Walter Lewis; Borel, Armand (1964), "On the compactification of arithmetically defined quotients of bounded symmetric domains", Bulletin of the American Mathematical Society, 70 (4): 588–593, doi:10.1090/S0002-9904-1964-11207-6, MR 0168802
- Baily, Walter Lewis; Borel, Armand (1966), "Compactification of arithmetic quotients of bounded symmetric domains", Annals of Mathematics, 84 (3): 442–528, doi:10.2307/1970457, JSTOR 1970457, MR 0216035
- Baily, Walter Lewis (1958), "On Satake's compactification of $V_n$", American Journal of Mathematics, 80: 348–364, doi:10.2307/2372789, JSTOR 2372789, MR 0099451
- Baily, Walter Lewis (1959), "On the Hilbert–Siegel modular space", American Journal of Mathematics, 81 (4): 846–874, doi:10.2307/2372991, JSTOR 2372991, MR 0121506
- On the orbit spaces of arithmetic groups, in: Arithmetical Algebraic Geometry (Proc. Conf. Purdue Univ., 1963), Harper and Row (1965), 4–10
- On compactifications of orbit spaces of arithmetic discontinuous groups acting on bounded symmetric domains, in: Algebraic Groups and Discontinuous Subgroups, Proceedings of Symposia in Pure Mathematics, 9, American Mathematical Society (1966), 281–295 MR 0207711
