= Complexification (Lie group) =

Universal construction of a complex Lie group from a real Lie group

In mathematics, the complexification or universal complexification of a real Lie group is given by a continuous homomorphism of the group into a complex Lie group with the universal property that every continuous homomorphism of the original group into another complex Lie group extends compatibly to a complex analytic homomorphism between the complex Lie groups. The complexification, which always exists, is unique up to unique isomorphism. Its Lie algebra is a quotient of the complexification of the Lie algebra of the original group. They are isomorphic if the original group has a quotient by a discrete normal subgroup which is linear.

For compact Lie groups, the complexification, sometimes called the Chevalley complexification after Claude Chevalley, can be defined as the group of complex characters of the Hopf algebra of representative functions, i.e. the matrix coefficients of finite-dimensional representations of the group. In any finite-dimensional faithful unitary representation of the compact group it can be realized concretely as a closed subgroup of the complex general linear group. It consists of operators with polar decomposition g = u • exp iX, where u is a unitary operator in the compact group and X is a skew-adjoint operator in its Lie algebra. In this case the complexification is a complex algebraic group and its Lie algebra is the complexification of the Lie algebra of the compact Lie group.

== Universal complexification ==
=== Definition ===
If G is a Lie group, a universal complexification is given by a complex Lie group G_{C} and a continuous homomorphism φ: G → G_{C} with the universal property that, if f: G → H is an arbitrary continuous homomorphism into a complex Lie group H, then there is a unique complex analytic homomorphism F: G_{C} → H such that f = F ∘ φ.

Universal complexifications always exist and are unique up to a unique complex analytic isomorphism (preserving inclusion of the original group).

=== Existence ===
If G is connected with Lie algebra 𝖌, then its universal covering group G is simply connected. Let G_{C} be the simply connected complex Lie group with Lie algebra 𝖌_{C} = 𝖌 ⊗ C, let Φ: G → G_{C} be the natural homomorphism (the unique morphism such that Φ_{*}: 𝖌 ↪ 𝖌 ⊗ C is the canonical inclusion) and suppose π: G → G is the universal covering map, so that ker π is the fundamental group of G. We have the inclusion Φ(ker π) ⊂ Z(G_{C}), which follows from the fact that the kernel of the adjoint representation of G_{C} equals its centre, combined with the equality

$$(C_{\Phi(k)})_*\circ \Phi_* = \Phi_* \circ (C_k)_* = \Phi_*$$

which holds for any k ∈ ker π. Denoting by Φ(ker π)^{*} the smallest closed normal Lie subgroup of G_{C} that contains Φ(ker π), we must now also have the inclusion Φ(ker π)^{*} ⊂ Z(G_{C}). We define the universal complexification of G as

$$G_{\mathbf C}=\frac{\mathbf G_{\mathbf C}}{\Phi(\ker \pi)^*}.$$

In particular, if G is simply connected, its universal complexification is just G_{C}.

The map φ: G → G_{C} is obtained by passing to the quotient. Since π is a surjective submersion, smoothness of the map π_{C} ∘ Φ implies smoothness of φ.

Construction of the complexification map

For non-connected Lie groups G with identity component G^{o} and component group Γ = G / G^{o}, the extension

$$\{1\} \rightarrow G^o \rightarrow G \rightarrow \Gamma \rightarrow \{1\}$$

induces an extension

$$\{1\} \rightarrow (G^o)_{\mathbf{C}} \rightarrow G_{\mathbf{C}} \rightarrow \Gamma \rightarrow \{1\}$$

and the complex Lie group G_{C} is a complexification of G.

==== Proof of the universal property ====
The map φ: G → G_{C} indeed possesses the universal property which appears in the above definition of complexification. The proof of this statement naturally follows from considering the following instructive diagram.

Here, $f\colon G\rightarrow H$ is an arbitrary smooth homomorphism of Lie groups with a complex Lie group as the codomain.

Existence of the map F

For simplicity, we assume $G$ is connected. To establish the existence of $F$, we first naturally extend the morphism of Lie algebras $f_*\colon \mathfrak g\rightarrow \mathfrak h$ to the unique morphism $\overline f_*\colon \mathfrak g_{\mathbf C}\rightarrow \mathfrak h$ of complex Lie algebras. Since $\mathbf G_{\mathbf C}$ is simply connected, Lie's second fundamental theorem now provides us with a unique complex analytic morphism $\overline F\colon \mathbf G_{\mathbf C}\rightarrow H$ between complex Lie groups, such that $(\overline F)_*=\overline f_*$. We define $F\colon G_{\mathbf C}\rightarrow H$ as the map induced by $\overline F$, that is: $F(g\,\Phi(\ker \pi)^*)=\overline F(g)$ for any $g\in\mathbf G_{\mathbf C}$. To show well-definedness of this map (i.e. $\Phi(\ker\pi)^*\subset \ker \overline F$), consider the derivative of the map $\overline F\circ \Phi$. For any $v\in T_e \mathbf G\cong \mathfrak g$, we have

$$(\overline F)_*\Phi_*v=(\overline F)_*(v\otimes 1)=f_*\pi_*v$$,

which (by simple connectedness of $\mathbf G$) implies $\overline F\circ\Phi=f\circ\pi$. This equality finally implies $\Phi(\ker\pi)\subset \ker \overline F$, and since $\ker \overline F$ is a closed normal Lie subgroup of $\mathbf G_{\mathbf C}$, we also have $\Phi(\ker \pi)^*\subset \ker \overline F$. Since $\pi_{\mathbb C}$ is a complex analytic surjective submersion, the map $F$ is complex analytic since $\overline F$ is. The desired equality $F\circ\varphi=f$ is imminent.

Uniqueness of the map F

To show uniqueness of $F$, suppose that $F_1,F_2$ are two maps with $F_1\circ\varphi=F_2\circ\varphi=f$. Composing with $\pi$ from the right and differentiating, we get $(F_1)_*(\pi_{\mathbf C})_*\Phi_*=(F_2)_*(\pi_{\mathbf C})_*\Phi_*$, and since $\Phi_*$ is the inclusion $\mathfrak g\hookrightarrow \mathfrak g_{\mathbf C}$, we get $(F_1)_*(\pi_{\mathbf C})_*=(F_2)_*(\pi_{\mathbf C})_*$. But $\pi_{\mathbf C}$ is a submersion, so $(F_1)_*=(F_2)_*$, thus connectedness of $G$ implies $F_1=F_2$.

=== Uniqueness ===
The universal property implies that the universal complexification is unique up to complex analytic isomorphism.

=== Injectivity ===
If the original group is linear, so too is the universal complexification and the homomorphism between the two is an inclusion. Onishchik & Vinberg (1994) give an example of a connected real Lie group for which the homomorphism is not injective even at the Lie algebra level: they take the product of T by the universal covering group of SL(2,R) and quotient out by the discrete cyclic subgroup generated by an irrational rotation in the first factor and a generator of the center in the second.

=== Basic examples ===
The following isomorphisms of complexifications of Lie groups with known Lie groups can be constructed directly from the general construction of the complexification.

- The complexification of the special unitary group of 2x2 matrices is

$$\mathrm{SU}(2)_{\mathbf C}\cong \mathrm{SL}(2,\mathbf C)$$.

This follows from the isomorphism of Lie algebras

$$\mathfrak{su}(2)_{\mathbf C}\cong \mathfrak{sl}(2,\mathbf C)$$,

together with the fact that $\mathrm{SU}(2)$ is simply connected.

- The complexification of the special linear group of 2x2 matrices is

$$\mathrm{SL}(2,\mathbf C)_{\mathbf C}\cong \mathrm{SL}(2,\mathbf C)\times \mathrm{SL}(2,\mathbf C)$$.

This follows from the isomorphism of Lie algebras

$$\mathfrak{sl}(2,\mathbf C)_{\mathbf C}\cong \mathfrak{sl}(2,\mathbf C) \oplus \mathfrak{sl}(2,\mathbf C)$$,

together with the fact that $\mathrm{SL}(2,\mathbf C)$ is simply connected.

- The complexification of the special orthogonal group of 3x3 matrices is

$$\mathrm{SO}(3)_{\mathbf C}\cong \frac{\mathrm{SL}(2,\mathbf C)}{\mathbf Z_2}\cong \mathrm{SO}^+(1,3)$$,

where $\mathrm{SO}^+(1,3)$ denotes the proper orthochronous Lorentz group. This follows from the fact that $\mathrm{SU}(2)$ is the universal (double) cover of $\mathrm{SO}(3)$, hence:

$$\mathfrak{so}(3)_{\mathbf C}\cong \mathfrak{su}(2)_{\mathbf C} \cong\mathfrak{sl}(2,\mathbf C)$$.

We also use the fact that $\mathrm{SL}(2,\mathbf C)$ is the universal (double) cover of $\mathrm{SO}^+(1,3)$.

- The complexification of the proper orthochronous Lorentz group is

$$\mathrm{SO}^+(1,3)_{\mathbf C}\cong \frac{\mathrm{SL}(2,\mathbf C)\times \mathrm{SL}(2,\mathbf C)}{\mathbf Z_2}$$.

This follows from the same isomorphism of Lie algebras as in the second example, again using the universal (double) cover of the proper orthochronous Lorentz group.

- The complexification of the special orthogonal group of 4x4 matrices is

$$\mathrm{SO}(4)_{\mathbf C}\cong \frac{\mathrm{SL}(2,\mathbf C)\times \mathrm{SL}(2,\mathbf C)}{\mathbf Z_2}$$.

This follows from the fact that $\mathrm{SU}(2)\times\mathrm{SU}(2)$ is the universal (double) cover of $\mathrm{SO}(4)$, hence $\mathfrak{so}(4)\cong \mathfrak{su}(2)\oplus\mathfrak{su}(2)$ and so $\mathfrak{so}(4)_{\mathbf C}\cong \mathfrak{sl}(2,\mathbf C)\oplus\mathfrak{sl}(2,\mathbf C)$.

The last two examples show that Lie groups with isomorphic complexifications may not be isomorphic. Furthermore, the complexifications of Lie groups $\mathrm{SU}(2)$ and $\mathrm{SL}(2,\mathbf C)$ show that complexification is not an idempotent operation, i.e. $(G_{\mathbf C})_{\mathbf C}\not\cong G_{\mathbf C}$ (this is also shown by complexifications of $\mathrm{SO}(3)$ and $\mathrm{SO}^+(1,3)$).

== Chevalley complexification ==
=== Hopf algebra of matrix coefficients ===
If G is a compact Lie group, the *-algebra A of matrix coefficients of finite-dimensional unitary representations is a uniformly dense *-subalgebra of C(G), the *-algebra of complex-valued continuous functions on G. It is naturally a Hopf algebra with comultiplication given by

$$\displaystyle{\Delta f(g,h)= f(gh).}$$

The characters of A are the *-homomorphisms of A into C. They can be identified with the point evaluations f ↦ f(g) for g in G and the comultiplication allows the group structure on G to be recovered. The homomorphisms of A into C also form a group. It is a complex Lie group and can be identified with the complexification G_{C} of G. The *-algebra A is generated by the matrix coefficients of any faithful representation σ of G. It follows that σ defines a faithful complex analytic representation of G_{C}.

=== Invariant theory ===
The original approach of Chevalley (1946) to the complexification of a compact Lie group can be concisely stated within the language of classical invariant theory, described in Weyl (1946). Let G be a closed subgroup of the unitary group U(V) where V is a finite-dimensional complex inner product space. Its Lie algebra consists of all skew-adjoint operators X such that exp tX lies in G for all real t. Set W = V ⊕ C with the trivial action of G on the second summand. The group G acts on W^{⊗N}, with an element u acting as u^{⊗N}. The commutant (or centralizer algebra) is denoted by A_{N} = End_{G} W^{⊗N}. It is generated as a *-algebra by its unitary operators and its commutant is the *-algebra spanned by the operators u^{⊗N}. The complexification G_{C} of G consists of all operators g in GL(V) such that g^{⊗N} commutes with A_{N} and g acts trivially on the second summand in C. By definition it is a closed subgroup of GL(V). The defining relations (as a commutant) show that G is an algebraic subgroup. Its intersection with U(V) coincides with G, since it is a priori a larger compact group for which the irreducible representations stay irreducible and inequivalent when restricted to G. Since A_{N} is generated by unitaries, an invertible operator g lies in G_{C} if the unitary operator u and positive operator p in its polar decomposition g = u ⋅ p both lie in G_{C}. Thus u lies in G and the operator p can be written uniquely as p = exp T with T a self-adjoint operator. By the functional calculus for polynomial functions it follows that h^{⊗N} lies in the commutant of A_{N} if h = exp z T with z in C. In particular taking z purely imaginary, T must have the form iX with X in the Lie algebra of G. Since every finite-dimensional representation of G occurs as a direct summand of W^{⊗N}, it is left invariant by G_{C} and thus every finite-dimensional representation of G extends uniquely to G_{C}. The extension is compatible with the polar decomposition. Finally the polar decomposition implies that G is a maximal compact subgroup of G_{C}, since a strictly larger compact subgroup would contain all integer powers of a positive operator p, a closed infinite discrete subgroup.

== Decompositions in the Chevalley complexification ==
=== Cartan decomposition ===
The decomposition derived from the polar decomposition

$$\displaystyle{G_{\mathbf{C}} = G\cdot P =G \cdot \exp i\mathfrak{g},}$$

where 𝖌 is the Lie algebra of G, is called the Cartan decomposition of G_{C}. The exponential factor P is invariant under conjugation by G but is not a subgroup. The complexification is invariant under taking adjoints, since G consists of unitary operators and P of positive operators.

=== Gauss decomposition ===
The Gauss decomposition is a generalization of the LU decomposition for the general linear group and a specialization of the Bruhat decomposition. For GL(V) it states that with respect to a given orthonormal basis e_{1}, ..., e_{n} an element g of GL(V) can be factorized in the form

$$\displaystyle{g=XDY}$$

with X lower unitriangular, Y upper unitriangular and D diagonal if and only if all the principal minors of g are non-vanishing. In this case X, Y and D are uniquely determined.

In fact Gaussian elimination shows there is a unique X such that X^{−1} g is upper triangular.

The upper and lower unitriangular matrices, N_{+} and N_{−}, are closed unipotent subgroups of GL(V). Their Lie algebras consist of upper and lower strictly triangular matrices. The exponential mapping is a polynomial mapping from the Lie algebra to the corresponding subgroup by nilpotence. The inverse is given by the logarithm mapping which by unipotence is also a polynomial mapping. In particular there is a correspondence between closed connected subgroups of N_{±} and subalgebras of their Lie algebras. The exponential map is onto in each case, since the polynomial function log ( e^{A} e^{B} ) lies in a given Lie subalgebra if A and B do and are sufficiently small.

The Gauss decomposition can be extended to complexifications of other closed connected subgroups G of U(V) by using the root decomposition to write the complexified Lie algebra as

$$\displaystyle{\mathfrak{g}_{\mathbf{C}} = \mathfrak{n}_- \oplus \mathfrak{t}_{\mathbf{C}} \oplus \mathfrak{n}_+,}$$

where 𝖙 is the Lie algebra of a maximal torus T of G and 𝖓_{±} are the direct sum of the corresponding positive and negative root spaces. In the weight space decomposition of V as eigenspaces of T, 𝖙 acts as diagonally, 𝖓_{+} acts as lowering operators and 𝖓_{−} as raising operators. 𝖓_{±} are nilpotent Lie algebras acting as nilpotent operators; they are each other's adjoints on V. In particular T acts by conjugation of 𝖓_{+}, so that 𝖙_{C} ⊕ 𝖓_{+} is a semidirect product of a nilpotent Lie algebra by an abelian Lie algebra.

By Engel's theorem, if 𝖆 ⊕ 𝖓 is a semidirect product, with 𝖆 abelian and 𝖓 nilpotent, acting on a finite-dimensional vector space W with operators in 𝖆 diagonalizable and operators in 𝖓 nilpotent, there is a vector w that is an eigenvector for 𝖆 and is annihilated by 𝖓. In fact it is enough to show there is a vector annihilated by 𝖓, which follows by induction on dim 𝖓, since the derived algebra 𝖓' annihilates a non-zero subspace of vectors on which 𝖓 / 𝖓' and 𝖆 act with the same hypotheses.

Applying this argument repeatedly to 𝖙_{C} ⊕ 𝖓_{+} shows that there is an orthonormal basis e_{1}, ..., e_{n} of V consisting of eigenvectors of 𝖙_{C} with 𝖓_{+} acting as upper triangular matrices with zeros on the diagonal.

If N_{±} and T_{C} are the complex Lie groups corresponding to 𝖓_{+} and 𝖙_{C}, then the Gauss decomposition states that the subset

$$\displaystyle{N_- T_{\mathbf{C}} N_+}$$

is a direct product and consists of the elements in G_{C} for which the principal minors are non-vanishing. It is open and dense. Moreover, if T denotes the maximal torus in U(V),

$$\displaystyle{N_\pm=\mathbf{N}_\pm\cap G_{\mathbf{C}},\,\,\, T_{\mathbf{C}} = \mathbf{T}_{\mathbf{C}}\cap G_{\mathbf{C}}.}$$

These results are an immediate consequence of the corresponding results for GL(V).

=== Bruhat decomposition ===
If W = N_{G}(T) / T denotes the Weyl group of T and B denotes the Borel subgroup T_{C} N_{+}, the Gauss decomposition is also a consequence of the more precise Bruhat decomposition

$$\displaystyle{G_{\mathbf{C}} =\bigcup_{\sigma\in W} B\sigma B,}$$

decomposing G_{C} into a disjoint union of double cosets of B. The complex dimension of a double coset BσB is determined by the length of σ as an element of W. The dimension is maximized at the Coxeter element and gives the unique open dense double coset. Its inverse conjugates B into the Borel subgroup of lower triangular matrices in G_{C}.

The Bruhat decomposition is easy to prove for SL(n,C). Let B be the Borel subgroup of upper triangular matrices and T_{C} the subgroup of diagonal matrices. So N(T_{C}) / T_{C} = S_{n}. For g in SL(n,C), take b in B so that bg maximizes the number of zeros appearing at the beginning of its rows. Because a multiple of one row can be added to another, each row has a different number of zeros in it. Multiplying by a matrix w in N(T_{C}), it follows that wbg lies in B. For uniqueness, if w_{1}b w_{2} = b_{0}, then the entries of w_{1}w_{2} vanish below the diagonal. So the product lies in T_{C}, proving uniqueness.

Chevalley (1955) showed that the expression of an element g as g = b_{1}σb_{2} becomes unique if b_{1} is restricted to lie in the upper unitriangular subgroup N_{σ} = N_{+} ∩ σ N_{−} σ^{−1}. In fact, if M_{σ} = N_{+} ∩ σ N_{+} σ^{−1}, this follows from the identity

$$\displaystyle{N_+=N_\sigma\cdot M_\sigma.}$$

The group N_{+} has a natural filtration by normal subgroups N_{+}(k) with zeros in the first k − 1 superdiagonals and the successive quotients are Abelian. Defining N_{σ}(k) and M_{σ}(k) to be the intersections with N_{+}(k), it follows by decreasing induction on k that N_{+}(k) = N_{σ}(k) ⋅ M_{σ}(k). Indeed, N_{σ}(k)N_{+}(k + 1) and M_{σ}(k)N_{+}(k + 1) are specified in N_{+}(k) by the vanishing of complementary entries (i, j) on the kth superdiagonal according to whether σ preserves the order i < j or not.

The Bruhat decomposition for the other classical simple groups can be deduced from the above decomposition using the fact that they are fixed point subgroups of folding automorphisms of SL(n,C). For Sp(n,C), let J be the n × n matrix with 1's on the antidiagonal and 0's elsewhere and set

$$\displaystyle{A=\begin{pmatrix} 0 & J\\ -J & 0\end{pmatrix}.}$$

Then Sp(n,C) is the fixed point subgroup of the involution θ(g) = A (g^{t})^{−1} A^{−1} of SL(2n,C). It leaves the subgroups N_{±}, T_{C} and B invariant. If the basis elements are indexed by n, n−1, ..., 1, −1, ..., −n, then the Weyl group of Sp(n,C) consists of σ satisfying σ(j) = −j, i.e. commuting with θ. Analogues of B, T_{C} and N_{±} are defined by intersection with Sp(n,C), i.e. as fixed points of θ. The uniqueness of the decomposition g = nσb = θ(n) θ(σ) θ(b) implies the Bruhat decomposition for Sp(n,C).

The same argument works for SO(n,C). It can be realised as the fixed points of ψ(g) = B (g^{t})^{−1} B^{−1} in SL(n,C) where B = J.

=== Iwasawa decomposition ===
The Iwasawa decomposition

$$\displaystyle{G_{\mathbf{C}} = G\cdot A \cdot N}$$

gives a decomposition for G_{C} for which, unlike the Cartan decomposition, the direct factor A ⋅ N is a closed subgroup, but it is no longer invariant under conjugation by G. It is the semidirect product of the nilpotent subgroup N by the Abelian subgroup A.

For U(V) and its complexification GL(V), this decomposition can be derived as a restatement of the Gram–Schmidt orthonormalization process.

In fact let e_{1}, ..., e_{n} be an orthonormal basis of V and let g be an element in GL(V). Applying the Gram–Schmidt process to ge_{1}, ..., ge_{n}, there is a unique orthonormal basis f_{1}, ..., f_{n} and positive constants a_{i} such that

$$\displaystyle{f_i= a_i ge_i + \sum_{j<i} n_{ji} ge_j.}$$

If k is the unitary taking (e_{i}) to (f_{i}), it follows that g^{−1}k lies in the subgroup AN, where A is the subgroup of positive diagonal matrices with respect to (e_{i}) and N is the subgroup of upper unitriangular matrices.

Using the notation for the Gauss decomposition, the subgroups in the Iwasawa decomposition for G_{C} are defined by

$$\displaystyle{A=\exp i\mathfrak{t} = \mathbf{A} \cap G_{\mathbf{C}}, \,\,\, N=\exp \mathfrak{n}_+=\mathbf{N}  \cap G_{\mathbf{C}}.}$$

Since the decomposition is direct for GL(V), it is enough to check that G_{C} = GAN. From the properties of the Iwasawa decomposition for GL(V), the map G × A × N is a diffeomorphism onto its image in G_{C}, which is closed. On the other hand, the dimension of the image is the same as the dimension of G_{C}, so it is also open. So G_{C} = GAN because G_{C} is connected.

Zhelobenko (1973) gives a method for explicitly computing the elements in the decomposition. For g in G_{C} set h = g*g. This is a positive self-adjoint operator so its principal minors do not vanish. By the Gauss decomposition, it can therefore be written uniquely in the form h = XDY with X in N_{−}, D in T_{C} and Y in N_{+}. Since h is self-adjoint, uniqueness forces Y = X*. Since it is also positive D must lie in A and have the form D = exp iT for some unique T in 𝖙. Let a = exp iT/2 be its unique square root in A. Set n = Y and k = g n^{−1} a^{−1}. Then k is unitary, so is in G, and g = kan.

== Complex structures on homogeneous spaces ==
The Iwasawa decomposition can be used to describe complex structures on the G-orbits in complex projective space of highest weight vectors of finite-dimensional irreducible representations of G. In particular the identification between G / T and G_{C} / B can be used to formulate the Borel–Weil theorem. It states that each irreducible representation of G can be obtained by holomorphic induction from a character of T, or equivalently that it is realized in the space of sections of a holomorphic line bundle on G / T.

The closed connected subgroups of G containing T are described by Borel–de Siebenthal theory. They are exactly the centralizers of tori S ⊆ T. Since every torus is generated topologically by a single element x, these are the same as centralizers C_{G}(X) of elements X in 𝖙. By a result of Hopf C_{G}(x) is always connected: indeed any element y is along with S contained in some maximal torus, necessarily contained in C_{G}(x).

Given an irreducible finite-dimensional representation V_{λ} with highest weight vector v of weight λ, the stabilizer of C v in G is a closed subgroup H. Since v is an eigenvector of T, H contains T. The complexification G_{C} also acts on V and the stabilizer is a closed complex subgroup P containing T_{C}. Since v is annihilated by every raising operator corresponding to a positive root α, P contains the Borel subgroup B. The vector v is also a highest weight vector for the copy of sl_{2} corresponding to α, so it is annihilated by the lowering operator generating 𝖌_{−α} if (λ, α) = 0. The Lie algebra p of P is the direct sum of 𝖙_{C} and root space vectors annihilating v, so that

$$\displaystyle{\mathfrak{p}=\mathfrak{b}\oplus \bigoplus_{(\alpha,\lambda)=0} \mathfrak{g}_{-\alpha}.}$$

The Lie algebra of H = P ∩ G is given by p ∩ 𝖌. By the Iwasawa decomposition G_{C} = GAN. Since AN fixes C v, the G-orbit of v in the complex projective space of V_{λ} coincides with the G_{C} orbit and

$$\displaystyle{G/H=G_{\mathbf{C}}/P.}$$

In particular

$$\displaystyle{G/T=G_{\mathbf{C}}/B.}$$

Using the identification of the Lie algebra of T with its dual, H equals the centralizer of λ in G, and hence is connected. The group P is also connected. In fact the space G / H is simply connected, since it can be written as the quotient of the (compact) universal covering group of the compact semisimple group G / Z by a connected subgroup, where Z is the center of G. If P^{o} is the identity component of P, G_{C} / P has G_{C} / P^{o} as a covering space, so that P = P^{o}. The homogeneous space G_{C} / P has a complex structure, because P is a complex subgroup. The orbit in complex projective space is closed in the Zariski topology by Chow's theorem, so is a smooth projective variety. The Borel–Weil theorem and its generalizations are discussed in this context in Serre (1954), Helgason (1994), Duistermaat & Kolk (2000) and Sepanski (2007).

The parabolic subgroup P can also be written as a union of double cosets of B

$$\displaystyle{P=\bigcup_{\sigma\in W_\lambda} B\sigma B,}$$

where W_{λ} is the stabilizer of λ in the Weyl group W. It is generated by the reflections corresponding to the simple roots orthogonal to λ.

== Noncompact real forms ==
There are other closed subgroups of the complexification of a compact connected Lie group G which have the same complexified Lie algebra. These are the other real forms of G_{C}.

=== Involutions of simply connected compact Lie groups ===
If G is a simply connected compact Lie group and σ is an automorphism of order 2, then the fixed point subgroup K = G^{σ} is automatically connected. (In fact this is true for any automorphism of G, as shown for inner automorphisms by Steinberg and in general by Borel.)

This can be seen most directly when the involution σ corresponds to a Hermitian symmetric space. In that case σ is inner and implemented by an element in a one-parameter subgroup exp tT contained in the center of G^{σ}. The innerness of σ implies that K contains a maximal torus of G, so has maximal rank. On the other hand, the centralizer of the subgroup generated by the torus S of elements exp tT is connected, since if x is any element in K there is a maximal torus containing x and S, which lies in the centralizer. On the other hand, it contains K since S is central in K and is contained in K since z lies in S. So K is the centralizer of S and hence connected. In particular K contains the center of G.

For a general involution σ, the connectedness of G^{σ} can be seen as follows.

The starting point is the Abelian version of the result: if T is a maximal torus of a simply connected group G and σ is an involution leaving invariant T and a choice of positive roots (or equivalently a Weyl chamber), then the fixed point subgroup T^{σ} is connected. In fact the kernel of the exponential map from $\mathfrak{t}$ onto T is a lattice Λ with a Z-basis indexed by simple roots, which σ permutes. Splitting up according to orbits, T can be written as a product of terms T on which σ acts trivially or terms T^{2} where σ interchanges the factors. The fixed point subgroup just corresponds to taking the diagonal subgroups in the second case, so is connected.

Now let x be any element fixed by σ, let S be a maximal torus in C_{G}(x)^{σ} and let T be the identity component of C_{G}(x, S). Then T is a maximal torus in G containing x and S. It is invariant under σ and the identity component of T^{σ} is S. In fact since x and S commute, they are contained in a maximal torus which, because it is connected, must lie in T. By construction T is invariant under σ. The identity component of T^{σ} contains S, lies in C_{G}(x)^{σ} and centralizes S, so it equals S. But S is central in T, to T must be Abelian and hence a maximal torus. For σ acts as multiplication by −1 on the Lie algebra $\mathfrak{t}\ominus \mathfrak{s}$, so it and therefore also $\mathfrak{t}$ are Abelian.

The proof is completed by showing that σ preserves a Weyl chamber associated with T. For then T^{σ} is connected so must equal S. Hence x lies in S. Since x was arbitrary, G^{σ} must therefore be connected.

To produce a Weyl chamber invariant under σ, note that there is no root space $\mathfrak{g}_\alpha$ on which both x and S acted trivially, for this would contradict the fact that C_{G}(x, S) has the same Lie algebra as T. Hence there must be an element s in S such that t = xs acts non-trivially on each root space. In this case t is a regular element of T—the identity component of its centralizer in G equals T. There is a unique Weyl alcove A in $\mathfrak{t}$ such that t lies in exp A and 0 lies in the closure of A. Since t is fixed by σ, the alcove is left invariant by σ and hence so also is the Weyl chamber C containing it.

=== Conjugations on the complexification ===
Let G be a simply connected compact Lie group with complexification G_{C}. The map c(g) = (g*)^{−1} defines an automorphism of G_{C} as a real Lie group with G as fixed point subgroup. It is conjugate-linear on $\mathfrak{g}_{\mathbf{C}}$ and satisfies c^{2} = id. Such automorphisms of either G_{C} or $\mathfrak{g}_{\mathbf{C}}$ are called conjugations. Since G_{C} is also simply connected any conjugation c_{1} on $\mathfrak{g}_{\mathbf{C}}$ corresponds to a unique automorphism c_{1} of G_{C}.

The classification of conjugations c_{0} reduces to that of involutions σ of G because given a c_{1} there is an automorphism φ of the complex group G_{C} such that

$$\displaystyle{c_0=\varphi\circ c_1\circ \varphi^{-1}}$$

commutes with c. The conjugation c_{0} then leaves G invariant and restricts to an involutive automorphism σ. By simple connectivity the same is true at the level of Lie algebras. At the Lie algebra level c_{0} can be recovered from σ by the formula

$$\displaystyle{c_0(X+iY)=\sigma(X)- i\sigma(Y)}$$

for X, Y in $\mathfrak{g}$.

To prove the existence of φ let ψ = c_{1}c an automorphism of the complex group G_{C}. On the Lie algebra level it defines a self-adjoint operator for the complex inner product

$$\displaystyle{(X,Y)=-B(X,c(Y)),}$$

where B is the Killing form on $\mathfrak{g}_{\mathbf{C}}$. Thus ψ^{2} is a positive operator and an automorphism along with all its real powers. In particular take

$$\displaystyle{\varphi=(\psi^2)^{1/4}}$$

It satisfies

$$\displaystyle{c_0c=\varphi c_1 \varphi^{-1} c=\varphi cc_1 \varphi=(\psi^2)^{1/2} \psi^{-1} =\varphi^{-1} cc_1 \varphi^{-1}=c \varphi c_1\varphi^{-1}=cc_0.}$$

=== Cartan decomposition in a real form ===
For the complexification G_{C}, the Cartan decomposition is described above. Derived from the polar decomposition in the complex general linear group, it gives a diffeomorphism

$$\displaystyle{G_{\mathbf{C}} = G\cdot \exp i\mathfrak{g} = G\cdot P = P\cdot G.}$$

On G_{C} there is a conjugation operator c corresponding to G as well as an involution σ commuting with c. Let c_{0} = c σ and let G_{0} be the fixed point subgroup of c. It is closed in the matrix group G_{C} and therefore a Lie group. The involution σ acts on both G and G_{0}. For the Lie algebra of G there is a decomposition

$$\displaystyle{\mathfrak{g}=\mathfrak{k} \oplus \mathfrak{p}}$$

into the +1 and −1 eigenspaces of σ. The fixed point subgroup K of σ in G is connected since G is simply connected. Its Lie algebra is the +1 eigenspace $\mathfrak{k}$. The Lie algebra of G_{0} is given by

$$\displaystyle{\mathfrak{g}=\mathfrak{k} \oplus \mathfrak{p}}$$

and the fixed point subgroup of σ is again K, so that G ∩ G_{0} = K. In G_{0}, there is a Cartan decomposition

$$\displaystyle{G_0=K\cdot \exp i\mathfrak{p} =K\cdot P_0 = P_0\cdot K}$$

which is again a diffeomorphism onto the direct and corresponds to the polar decomposition of matrices. It is the restriction of the decomposition on G_{C}. The product gives a diffeomorphism onto a closed subset of G_{0}. To check that it is surjective, for g in G_{0} write g = u ⋅ p with u in G and p in P. Since c_{0} g = g, uniqueness implies that σu = u and σp = p^{−1}. Hence u lies in K and p in P_{0}.

The Cartan decomposition in G_{0} shows that G_{0} is connected, simply connected and noncompact, because of the direct factor P_{0}. Thus G_{0} is a noncompact real semisimple Lie group.

Moreover, given a maximal Abelian subalgebra $\mathfrak{a}$ in $\mathfrak{p}$, A = exp $\mathfrak{a}$ is a toral subgroup such that σ(a) = a^{−1} on A; and any two such $\mathfrak{a}$'s are conjugate by an element of K. The properties of A can be shown directly. A is closed because the closure of A is a toral subgroup satisfying σ(a) = a^{−1}, so its Lie algebra lies in $\mathfrak{m}$ and hence equals $\mathfrak{a}$ by maximality. A can be generated topologically by a single element exp X, so $\mathfrak{a}$ is the centralizer of X in $\mathfrak{m}$. In the K-orbit of any element of $\mathfrak{m}$ there is an element Y such that (X,Ad k Y) is minimized at k = 1. Setting k = exp tT with T in $\mathfrak{k}$, it follows that (X,[T,Y]) = 0 and hence [X,Y] = 0, so that Y must lie in $\mathfrak{a}$. Thus $\mathfrak{m}$ is the union of the conjugates of $\mathfrak{a}$. In particular some conjugate of X lies in any other choice of $\mathfrak{a}$, which centralizes that conjugate; so by maximality the only possibilities are conjugates of $\mathfrak{a}$.

A similar statements hold for the action of K on $\mathfrak{a}_0=i\mathfrak{a}$ in $\mathfrak{p}_0$. Moreover, from the Cartan decomposition for G_{0}, if A_{0} = exp $\mathfrak{a}_0$, then

$$\displaystyle{G_0=KA_0K.}$$

== See also ==
- Real form (Lie theory)
