= Baily–Borel compactification =

In mathematics, the Baily–Borel compactification is a compactification of a quotient of a Hermitian symmetric space by an arithmetic group, introduced by Walter L. Baily and Armand Borel (1964, 1966).

== Example ==
- If C is the quotient of the upper half plane by a congruence subgroup of SL_{2}(Z), then the Baily–Borel compactification of C is formed by adding a finite number of cusps to it.

== See also ==
- L² cohomology
