= Timothy J. Hickey =

American computer scientist

- Education: Brandeis University; University of Chicago
- Scientific career
- Workplaces: Brandeis University
- Thesis: On the Fourier-Jacobi Coefficients of Certain Eisenstein Series for a Unitary Group (1986)
- Doctoral advisor: Walter Lewis Baily, Jr.
- Website: https://www.cs.brandeis.edu/~tim/

Timothy J. Hickey (July 24, 1955 - June 10, 2026) was a professor of computer science and former Chair of the Computer Science department (2002-2010), Chair of the Science Council (2009-2010), and Chair of Faculty Senate (2010-2012) at Brandeis University.

Hickey's specialties included analysis of algorithms, logic programming and parallel processing, symbolic manipulation, and groupware. His research involved the study of Educational Technology, Brain-Computer Interfaces and Game-based Learning. He was the co-creator and lead developer of the JScheme programming language, the GrewpEdit collaborative editor, as well as the Computer-Supported Agile Teaching (CSAT) tool Discovery Teaching.

He studied at Brandeis University, graduating with a Bachelor of Science in Mathematics in 1977. Subsequently, he attended the University of Chicago, receiving a Masters in 1978 and a Ph.D. in Mathematics in 1986 under advisor Walter Lewis Baily Jr. (On the Fourier-Jacobi Coefficients of Certain Eisenstein Series for a Unitary Group).

== Death ==
At 6pm on June 10, 2026, Hickey died due to complications from stage IV lung cancer (adenocarcinoma). He chronicled his cancer journey on his blog.
