= Hermitian symmetric space =

Manifold with inversion symmetry

In mathematics, a Hermitian symmetric space is a Hermitian manifold which at every point has an inversion symmetry preserving the Hermitian structure. First studied by Élie Cartan, they form a natural generalization of the notion of Riemannian symmetric space from real manifolds to complex manifolds.

Every Hermitian symmetric space is a homogeneous space for its isometry group and has a unique decomposition as a product of irreducible spaces and a Euclidean space. The irreducible spaces arise in pairs as a non-compact space that, as Borel showed, can be embedded as an open subspace of its compact dual space. Harish Chandra showed that each non-compact space can be realized as a bounded symmetric domain in a complex vector space. The simplest case involves the groups SU(2), SU(1,1) and their common complexification SL(2,C). In this case the non-compact space is the unit disk, a homogeneous space for SU(1,1). It is a bounded domain in the complex plane C. The one-point compactification of C, the Riemann sphere, is the dual space, a homogeneous space for SU(2) and SL(2,C).

Irreducible compact Hermitian symmetric spaces are exactly the homogeneous spaces of simple compact Lie groups by maximal closed connected subgroups which contain a maximal torus and have center isomorphic to the circle group. There is a complete classification of irreducible spaces, with four classical series, studied by Cartan, and two exceptional cases; the classification can be deduced from Borel–de Siebenthal theory, which classifies closed connected subgroups containing a maximal torus. Hermitian symmetric spaces appear in the theory of Jordan triple systems, several complex variables, complex geometry, automorphic forms and group representations, in particular permitting the construction of the holomorphic discrete series representations of semisimple Lie groups.

== Hermitian symmetric spaces of compact type ==
=== Definition ===
Let H be a connected compact semisimple Lie group, σ an automorphism of H of order 2 and H^{σ} the fixed point subgroup of σ. Let K be a closed subgroup of H lying between H^{σ} and its identity component. The compact homogeneous space H / K is called a symmetric space of compact type. The Lie algebra $\mathfrak{h}$ admits a decomposition

$$\displaystyle{\mathfrak{h}=\mathfrak{k}\oplus\mathfrak{m},}$$

where $\mathfrak{k}$, the Lie algebra of K, is the +1 eigenspace of σ and $\mathfrak{m}$ the –1 eigenspace. If $\mathfrak{k}$ contains no simple summand of $\mathfrak{h}$, the pair ($\mathfrak{h}$, σ) is called an orthogonal symmetric Lie algebra of compact type.

Any inner product on $\mathfrak{h}$, invariant under the adjoint representation and σ, induces a Riemannian structure on H / K, with H acting by isometries. A canonical example is given by minus the Killing form. Under such an inner product, $\mathfrak{k}$ and $\mathfrak{m}$ are orthogonal. H / K is then a Riemannian symmetric space of compact type.

The symmetric space H / K is called a Hermitian symmetric space if it has an almost complex structure preserving the Riemannian metric. This is equivalent to the existence of a linear map J with J^{2} = −I on $\mathfrak{m}$ which preserves the inner product and commutes with the action of K.

=== Symmetry and center of isotropy subgroup ===
If ($\mathfrak{h}$,σ) is Hermitian, K has non-trivial center and the symmetry σ is inner, implemented by an element of the center of K.

In fact J lies in $\mathfrak{k}$ and exp tJ forms a one-parameter group in the center of K. This follows because if A, B, C, D lie in $\mathfrak{m}$, then by the invariance of the inner product on $\mathfrak{h}$

$$\displaystyle{([[A,B],C],D)=([A,B],[C,D])=([[C,D],B],A).}$$

Replacing A and B by JA and JB, it follows that

$$\displaystyle{[JA,JB] = [A,B].}$$

Define a linear map δ on $\mathfrak{h}$ by extending J to be 0 on $\mathfrak{k}$. The last relation shows that δ is a derivation of $\mathfrak{h}$. Since $\mathfrak{h}$ is semisimple, δ must be an inner derivation, so that

$$\displaystyle{\delta(X)=[T + A,X],}$$

with T in $\mathfrak{k}$ and A in $\mathfrak{m}$. Taking X in $\mathfrak{k}$, it follows that A = 0 and T lies in the center of $\mathfrak{k}$ and hence that K is non-semisimple. The symmetry σ is implemented by z = exp πT and the almost complex structure by exp π/2 T.

The innerness of σ implies that K contains a maximal torus of H, so has maximal rank. On the other hand, the centralizer of the subgroup generated by the torus S of elements exp tT is connected, since if x is any element in K there is a maximal torus containing x and S, which lies in the centralizer. On the other hand, it contains K since S is central in K and is contained in K since z lies in S. So K is the centralizer of S and hence connected. In particular K contains the center of H.

=== Irreducible decomposition ===
The symmetric space or the pair ($\mathfrak{h}$, σ) is said to be irreducible if the adjoint action of $\mathfrak{k}$ (or equivalently the identity component of H^{σ} or K) is irreducible on $\mathfrak{m}$. This is equivalent to the maximality of $\mathfrak{k}$ as a subalgebra.

In fact there is a one-one correspondence between intermediate subalgebras $\mathfrak{l}$ and K-invariant subspaces $\mathfrak{m}_1$ of $\mathfrak{m}$ given by

$$\displaystyle{\mathfrak{l}=\mathfrak{k}\oplus \mathfrak{m}_1,\,\,\,\ \mathfrak{m}_1=\mathfrak{l}\cap \mathfrak{m}.}$$

Any orthogonal symmetric algebra ($\mathfrak{g}$, σ) of Hermitian type can be decomposed as an (orthogonal) direct sum of irreducible orthogonal symmetric algebras of Hermitian type.

In fact $\mathfrak{h}$ can be written as a direct sum of simple algebras

$$\displaystyle{\mathfrak{h}=\oplus_{i=1}^N \mathfrak{h}_i,}$$

each of which is left invariant by the automorphism σ and the complex structure J, since they are both inner. The eigenspace decomposition of $\mathfrak{h}_1$ coincides with its intersections with $\mathfrak{k}$ and $\mathfrak{m}$. So the restriction of σ to $\mathfrak{h}_1$ is irreducible.

This decomposition of the orthogonal symmetric Lie algebra yields a direct product decomposition of the corresponding compact symmetric space H / K when H is simply connected. In this case the fixed point subgroup H^{σ} is automatically connected. For simply connected H, the symmetric space H / K is the direct product of H_{i} / K_{i} with H_{i} simply connected and simple. In the irreducible case, K is a maximal connected subgroup of H. Since K acts irreducibly on $\mathfrak{m}$ (regarded as a complex space for the complex structure defined by J), the center of K is a one-dimensional torus T, given by the operators exp tT. Since each H is simply connected and K connected, the quotient H/K is simply connected.

=== Complex structure ===
if H / K is irreducible with K non-semisimple, the compact group H must be simple and K of maximal rank. From Borel-de Siebenthal theory, the involution σ is inner and K is the centralizer of its center, which is isomorphic to T. In particular K is connected. It follows that H / K is simply connected and there is a parabolic subgroup P in the complexification G of H such that H / K = G / P. In particular there is a complex structure on H / K and the action of H is holomorphic. Since any Hermitian symmetric space is a product of irreducible spaces, the same is true in general.

At the Lie algebra level, there is a symmetric decomposition

$$\mathfrak h = \mathfrak k\oplus\mathfrak m,$$

where $(\mathfrak m,J)$ is a real vector space with a complex structure J, whose complex dimension is given in the table. Correspondingly, there is a graded Lie algebra decomposition

$$\mathfrak g = \mathfrak{m}_{+}\oplus\mathfrak l\oplus\mathfrak{m}_-$$

where $\mathfrak m\otimes\mathbb C= \mathfrak m_{-}\oplus\mathfrak m_{+}$ is the decomposition into +i and −i eigenspaces of J and $\mathfrak l=\mathfrak k\otimes\mathbb C$. The Lie algebra of P is the semidirect product $\mathfrak m_{+}\oplus\mathfrak l$. The complex Lie algebras $\mathfrak{m}_\pm$ are Abelian. Indeed, if U and V lie in $\mathfrak{m}_\pm$, [U,V] = J[U,V] = [JU,JV] = [±iU,±iV] = –[U,V], so the Lie bracket must vanish.

The complex subspaces $\mathfrak{m}_\pm$ of $\mathfrak{m}_{\mathbb C}$ are irreducible for the action of K, since J commutes with K so that each is isomorphic to $\mathfrak{m}$ with complex structure ±J. Equivalently the centre T of K acts on $\mathfrak{m}_+$ by the identity representation and on $\mathfrak{m}_-$ by its conjugate.

The realization of H/K as a generalized flag variety G/P is obtained by taking G as in the table (the complexification of H) and P to be the parabolic subgroup equal to the semidirect product of L, the complexification of K, with the complex Abelian subgroup exp $\mathfrak{m}_+$. (In the language of algebraic groups, L is the Levi factor of P.)

=== Classification ===
Any Hermitian symmetric space of compact type is simply connected and can be written as a direct product of irreducible hermitian symmetric spaces H_{i} / K_{i} with H_{i} simple, K_{i} connected of maximal rank with center T. The irreducible ones are therefore exactly the non-semisimple cases classified by Borel–de Siebenthal theory.

Accordingly, the irreducible compact Hermitian symmetric spaces H/K are classified as follows.

G	H	K	complex dimension	rank	geometric interpretation
$\mathrm{SL}(p+q,\mathbb{C})$	$\mathrm{SU}(p+q)\,$	$\mathrm{S}(\mathrm{U}(p) \times \mathrm{U}(q))$	pq	min(p,q)	Grassmannian of complex p-dimensional subspaces of $\mathbb{C}^{p+q}$
$\mathrm{SO}(2n,\mathbb C)$	$\mathrm{SO}(2n)\,$	$\mathrm{U}(n)\,$	$\tfrac 12 n(n-1)$	$[\tfrac 12 n]$	Space of orthogonal complex structures on $\mathbb{R}^{2n}$
$\mathrm{Sp}(2n,\mathbb C)\,$	$\mathrm{Sp}(n)\,$	$\mathrm{U}(n)\,$	$\tfrac 12 n(n+1)$	n	Space of complex structures on $\mathbb{H}^n$ compatible with the inner product
$\mathrm{SO}(n+2,\mathbb{C})$	$\mathrm{SO}(n+2)\,$	$\mathrm{SO}(n) \times \mathrm{SO}(2)$	n	2	Grassmannian of oriented real 2-dimensional subspaces of $\mathbb{R}^{n+2}$
$E_6^{\mathbb C}\,$	$E_6\,$	$\mathrm{SO}(10)\times\mathrm{SO}(2)$	16	2	Rosenfeld projective plane $(\mathbb{C}\otimes\mathbb{O})P^2$
$E_7^{\mathbb C}$	$E_7\,$	$E_6\times\mathrm{SO}(2)$	27	3	Space of symmetric submanifolds of the Rosenfeld projective plane $(\mathbb{H}\otimes\mathbb{O})P^2$ that are isomorphic to $(\mathbb{C}\otimes\mathbb{O})P^2$

In terms of the classification of compact Riemannian symmetric spaces, the Hermitian symmetric spaces are the four infinite series AIII, DIII, CI and BDI with p = 2 or q = 2, and two exceptional spaces, namely EIII and EVII.

=== Classical examples ===
The irreducible Hermitian symmetric spaces of compact type are all simply connected. The corresponding symmetry σ of the simply connected simple compact Lie group is inner, given by conjugation by the unique element S in Z(K) / Z(H) of period 2. For the classical groups, as in the table above, these symmetries are as follows:

- AIII:
  $$S=\begin{pmatrix}-\alpha I_p & 0\\ 0 & \alpha I_q\end{pmatrix}$$
  in S(U(p)×U(q)), where α^{p+q}=(−1)^{p}.
- DIII: S = iI in U(n) ⊂ SO(2n); this choice is equivalent to
  $$J_n=\begin{pmatrix}0 &I_n \\ -I_n & 0\end{pmatrix}$$.
- CI: S=iI in U(n) ⊂ Sp(n) = Sp(n,C) ∩ U(2n); this choice is equivalent to J_{n}.
- BDI:
  $$S=\begin{pmatrix}I_p & 0\\ 0 & -I_2\end{pmatrix}$$
  in SO(p)×SO(2).

The maximal parabolic subgroup P can be described explicitly in these classical cases. For AIII

$$\displaystyle{P(p,q)= \begin{pmatrix}A_{pp} & B_{pq}\\ 0 & D_{qq}\end{pmatrix}}$$

in SL(p+q,C). P(p,q) is the stabilizer of a subspace of dimension p in C^{p+q}.

The other groups arise as fixed points of involutions. Let J be the n × n matrix with 1's on the antidiagonal and 0's elsewhere and set

$$\displaystyle{A=\begin{pmatrix} 0 & J\\ -J & 0\end{pmatrix}.}$$

Then Sp(n,C) is the fixed point subgroup of the involution θ(g) = A (g^{t})^{−1} A^{−1} of SL(2n,C). SO(n,C) can be realised as the fixed points of ψ(g) = B (g^{t})^{−1} B^{−1} in SL(n,C) where B = J. These involutions leave invariant P(n,n) in the cases DIII and CI and P(p,2) in the case BDI. The corresponding parabolic subgroups P are obtained by taking the fixed points. The compact group H acts transitively on G / P, so that G / P = H / K.

== Hermitian symmetric spaces of noncompact type ==
=== Definition ===
As with symmetric spaces in general, each compact Hermitian symmetric space H/K has a noncompact dual H^{*}/K obtained by replacing H with the closed real Lie subgroup H^{*} of the complex Lie group G with Lie algebra

$$\mathfrak h^* = \mathfrak k \oplus i\mathfrak m\subset\mathfrak g.$$

=== Borel embedding ===
Whereas the natural map from H/K to G/P is an isomorphism, the natural map from H^{*}/K to G/P is only an inclusion onto an open subset. This inclusion is called the Borel embedding after Armand Borel. In fact P ∩ H = K = P ∩ H*. The images of H and H* have the same dimension so are open. Since the image of H is compact, so closed, it follows that H/K = G/P.

=== Cartan decomposition ===
The polar decomposition in the complex linear group G implies the Cartan decomposition H* = K ⋅ exp $i\mathfrak{m}$ in H*.

Moreover, given a maximal Abelian subalgebra $\mathfrak{a}$ in t, A = exp $\mathfrak{a}$ is a toral subgroup such that σ(a) = a^{−1} on A; and any two such $\mathfrak{a}$'s are conjugate by an element of K. A similar statement holds for $\mathfrak{a}^*=i\mathfrak{a}$. Moreover if A* = exp $\mathfrak{a}^*$, then

$$\displaystyle{H^*=KA^*K.}$$

These results are special cases of the Cartan decomposition in any Riemannian symmetric space and its dual. The geodesics emanating from the origin in the homogeneous spaces can be identified with one parameter groups with generators in $i\mathfrak{m}$ or $\mathfrak{m}$. Similar results hold for in the compact case: H= K ⋅ exp $i\mathfrak{m}$ and H = KAK.

The properties of the totally geodesic subspace A can be shown directly. A is closed because the closure of A is a toral subgroup satisfying σ(a) = a^{−1}, so its Lie algebra lies in $\mathfrak{m}$ and hence equals $\mathfrak{a}$ by maximality. A can be generated topologically by a single element exp X, so $\mathfrak{a}$ is the centralizer of X in $\mathfrak{m}$. In the K-orbit of any element of $\mathfrak{m}$ there is an element Y such that (X,Ad k Y) is minimized at k = 1. Setting k = exp tT with T in $\mathfrak{k}$, it follows that (X,[T,Y]) = 0 and hence [X,Y] = 0, so that Y must lie in $\mathfrak{a}$. Thus $\mathfrak{m}$ is the union of the conjugates of $\mathfrak{a}$. In particular some conjugate of X lies in any other choice of $\mathfrak{a}$, which centralizes that conjugate; so by maximality the only possibilities are conjugates of $\mathfrak{a}$.

The decompositions

$$\displaystyle{H=KAK,\,\,\,H = K\cdot \exp \mathfrak{m}}$$

can be proved directly by applying the slice theorem for compact transformation groups to the action of K on H / K. In fact the space H / K can be identified with

$$\displaystyle{M=\{ \sigma(g)g^{-1}:g\in H\},}$$

a closed submanifold of H, and the Cartan decomposition follows by showing that M is the union of the kAk^{−1} for k in K. Since this union is the continuous image of K × A, it is compact and connected. So it suffices to show that the union is open in M and for this it is enough to show each a in A has an open neighbourhood in this union. Now by computing derivatives at 0, the union contains an open neighbourhood of 1. If a is central the union is invariant under multiplication by a, so contains an open neighbourhood of a. If a is not central, write a = b^{2} with b in A. Then τ = Ad b − Ad b^{−1} is a skew-adjoint operator on $\mathfrak{h}$ anticommuting with σ, which can be regarded as a Z_{2}-grading operator σ on $\mathfrak{h}$. By an Euler–Poincaré characteristic argument it follows that the superdimension of $\mathfrak{h}$ coincides with the superdimension of the kernel of τ. In other words,

$$\displaystyle{\mathrm{dim} \,\mathfrak{k} - \mathrm{dim} \,\mathfrak{k}_a = \mathrm{dim} \,\mathfrak{m} - \mathrm{dim} \,\mathfrak{m}_a,}$$

where $\mathfrak{k}_a$ and $\mathfrak{m}_a$ are the subspaces fixed by Ad a. Let the orthogonal complement of $\mathfrak{k}_a$ in $\mathfrak{k}$ be $\mathfrak{k}_a^\perp$. Computing derivatives, it follows that Ad e^{X} (a e^{Y}), where X lies in $\mathfrak{k}_a^\perp$ and Y in $\mathfrak{m}_a$, is an open neighbourhood of a in the union. Here the terms a e^{Y} lie in the union by the argument for central a: indeed a is in the center of the identity component of the centralizer of a which is invariant under σ and contains A.

The dimension of $\mathfrak{a}$ is called the rank of the Hermitian symmetric space.

=== Strongly orthogonal roots ===
In the case of Hermitian symmetric spaces, Harish-Chandra gave a canonical choice for $\mathfrak{a}$. This choice of $\mathfrak{a}$ is determined by taking a maximal torus T of H in K with Lie algebra $\mathfrak{t}$. Since the symmetry σ is implemented by an element of T lying in the centre of H, the root spaces $\mathfrak{g}_\alpha$ in $\mathfrak{g}$ are left invariant by σ. It acts as the identity on those contained in $\mathfrak{k}_{\mathbb{C}}$ and minus the identity on those in $\mathfrak{m}_{\mathbb{C}}$.

The roots with root spaces in $\mathfrak{k}_{\mathbb{C}}$ are called compact roots and those with root spaces in $\mathfrak{m}_{\mathbb{C}}$ are called noncompact roots. (This terminology originates from the symmetric space of noncompact type.) If H is simple, the generator Z of the centre of K can be used to define a set of positive roots, according to the sign of α(Z). With this choice of roots $\mathfrak{m}_+$ and $\mathfrak{m}_-$ are the direct sum of the root spaces $\mathfrak{g}_\alpha$ over positive and negative noncompact roots α. Root vectors E_{α} can be chosen so that

$$\displaystyle{X_\alpha=E_\alpha + E_{-\alpha}, \,\,\, Y_\alpha=i(E_\alpha - E_{-\alpha})}$$

lie in $\mathfrak{h}$. The simple roots α_{1}, ...., α_{n} are the indecomposable positive roots. These can be numbered so that α_{i} vanishes on the center of $\mathfrak{h}$ for i, whereas α_{1} does not. Thus α_{1} is the unique noncompact simple root and the other simple roots are compact. Any positive noncompact root then has the form β = α_{1} + c_{2} α_{2} + ⋅⋅⋅ + c_{n} α_{n} with non-negative coefficients c_{i}. These coefficients lead to a lexicographic order on positive roots. The coefficient of α_{1} is always one because $\mathfrak{m}_-$ is irreducible for K so is spanned by vectors obtained by successively applying the lowering operators E_{–α} for simple compact roots α.

Two roots α and β are said to be strongly orthogonal if ±α ±β are not roots or zero, written α ≐ β. The highest positive root ψ_{1} is noncompact. Take ψ_{2} to be the highest noncompact positive root strongly orthogonal to ψ_{1} (for the lexicographic order). Then continue in this way taking ψ_{i + 1} to be the highest noncompact positive root strongly orthogonal to ψ_{1}, ..., ψ_{i} until the process terminates. The corresponding vectors

$$\displaystyle{X_i= E_{\psi_i} + E_{-\psi_i}}$$

lie in $\mathfrak{m}$ and commute by strong orthogonality. Their span $\mathfrak{a}$ is Harish-Chandra's canonical maximal Abelian subalgebra. (As Sugiura later showed, having fixed T, the set of strongly orthogonal roots is uniquely determined up to applying an element in the Weyl group of K.)

Maximality can be checked by showing that if

$$\displaystyle{[\sum c_\alpha E_\alpha + \overline{c_\alpha}E_{-\alpha}, E_{\psi_i} + E_{-\psi_i}]=0}$$

for all i, then c_{α} = 0 for all positive noncompact roots α different from the ψ_{j}'s. This follows by showing inductively that if c_{α} ≠ 0, then α is strongly orthogonal to ψ_{1}, ψ_{2}, ... a contradiction. Indeed, the above relation shows ψ_{i} + α cannot be a root; and that if ψ_{i} – α is a root, then it would necessarily have the form β – ψ_{i}. If ψ_{i} – α were negative, then α would be a higher positive root than ψ_{i}, strongly orthogonal to the ψ_{j} with j < i, which is not possible; similarly if β – ψ_{i} were positive.

=== Polysphere and polydisk theorem ===
Harish-Chandra's canonical choice of $\mathfrak{a}$ leads to a polydisk and polysphere theorem in H*/K and H/K. This result reduces the geometry to products of the prototypic example involving SL(2,C), SU(1,1) and SU(2), namely the unit disk inside the Riemann sphere.

In the case of H = SU(2) the symmetry σ is given by conjugation by the diagonal matrix with entries ±i so that

$$\displaystyle{\sigma\begin{pmatrix} \alpha & \beta\\ -\overline{\beta} & \overline{\alpha}\end{pmatrix} =
\begin{pmatrix} \alpha & -\beta\\ \overline{\beta} & \overline{\alpha}\end{pmatrix}}$$

The fixed point subgroup is the maximal torus T, the diagonal matrices with entries e^{±it}. SU(2) acts on the Riemann sphere $\mathbf{CP}^1$ transitively by Möbius transformations and T is the stabilizer of 0. SL(2,C), the complexification of SU(2), also acts by Möbius transformations and the stabiliser of 0 is the subgroup B of lower triangular matrices. The noncompact subgroup SU(1,1) acts with precisely three orbits: the open unit disk |z| < 1; the unit circle z = 1; and its exterior |z| > 1. Thus

$$\displaystyle{\mathrm{SU}(1,1)/\mathbf{T} = \{z: |z|<1\} \,\,\, \subset \,\,\, B_+/\mathbf{T}_{\mathbb{C}} = \mathbb{C}\,\,\, \subset \,\,\,\mathrm{SL}(2,\mathbb{C})/B = \mathbb{C}\cup\{\infty\},}$$

where B_{+} and T_{C} denote the subgroups of upper triangular and diagonal matrices in SL(2,C). The middle term is the orbit of 0 under the upper unitriangular matrices

$$\displaystyle{\begin{pmatrix} 1 & z\\ 0 & 1\end{pmatrix} =\exp \begin{pmatrix} 0 & z\\ 0 & 0\end{pmatrix}.}$$

Now for each root ψ_{i} there is a homomorphism of π_{i} of SU(2) into H which is compatible with the symmetries. It extends uniquely to a homomorphism of SL(2,C) into G. The images of the Lie algebras for different ψ_{i}'s commute since they are strongly orthogonal. Thus there is a homomorphism π of the direct product SU(2)^{r} into H compatible with the symmetries. It extends to a homomorphism of SL(2,C)^{r} into G. The kernel of π is contained in the center (±1)^{r} of SU(2)^{r} which is fixed pointwise by the symmetry. So the image of the center under π lies in K. Thus there is an embedding of the polysphere (SU(2)/T)^{r} into H / K = G / P and the polysphere contains the polydisk (SU(1,1)/T)^{r}. The polysphere and polydisk are the direct product of r copies of the Riemann sphere and the unit disk. By the Cartan decompositions in SU(2) and SU(1,1), the polysphere is the orbit of T_{r}A in H / K and the polydisk is the orbit of T_{r}A*, where T_{r} = π(T^{r}) ⊆ K. On the other hand, H = KAK and H* = K A* K.

Hence every element in the compact Hermitian symmetric space H / K is in the K-orbit of a point in the polysphere; and every element in the image under the Borel embedding of the noncompact Hermitian symmetric space H* / K is in the K-orbit of a point in the polydisk.

=== Harish-Chandra embedding ===
H* / K, the Hermitian symmetric space of noncompact type, lies in the image of $\exp \mathfrak m_+$, a dense open subset of H / K biholomorphic to $\mathfrak m_+$. The corresponding domain in $\mathfrak m_+$ is bounded. This is the Harish-Chandra embedding named after Harish-Chandra.

In fact Harish-Chandra showed the following properties of the space $\mathbf{X}=\exp (\mathfrak{m}_+)\cdot K_{\mathbb{C}} \cdot \exp(\mathfrak{m}_-)=\exp (\mathfrak{m}_+)\cdot P$:

1. As a space, X is the direct product of the three factors.
2. X is open in G.
3. X is dense in G.
4. X contains H*.
5. The closure of H* / K in X / P = $\exp \mathfrak{m}_+$ is compact.

In fact $M_\pm=\exp \mathfrak{m}_\pm$ are complex Abelian groups normalised by K_{C}. Moreover, $[\mathfrak{m}_+,\mathfrak{m}_-] \subset \mathfrak{k}_{\mathfrak{C}}$ since $[\mathfrak{m},\mathfrak{m}] \subset \mathfrak{k}$.

This implies P ∩ M_{+} = {1}. For if x = e^{X} with X in $\mathfrak{m}_+$ lies in P, it must normalize M_{−} and hence $\mathfrak{m}_-$. But if Y lies in $\mathfrak{m}_-$, then

$$\displaystyle{Y=\mathrm{Ad}(X)\cdot Y= Y + [X,Y] + {1\over 2} [X,[X,Y]]\in \mathfrak{m}_+ \oplus \mathfrak{k}_{\mathbb{C}} \oplus \mathfrak{m}_-,}$$

so that X commutes with $\mathfrak{m}_-$. But if X commutes with every noncompact root space, it must be 0, so x = 1. It follows that the multiplication map μ on M_{+} × P is injective so (1) follows. Similarly the derivative of μ at (x,p) is

$$\displaystyle{\mu^\prime(X,Y)=\mathrm{Ad}(p^{-1})X + Y =\mathrm{Ad}(p^{-1})(X\oplus\mathrm{Ad}(p)Y),}$$

which is injective, so (2) follows. For the special case H = SU(2), H* = SU(1,1) and G = SL(2,C) the remaining assertions are consequences of the identification with the Riemann sphere, C and unit disk. They can be applied to the groups defined for each root ψ_{i}. By the polysphere and polydisk theorem H*/K, X/P and H/K are the union of the K-translates of the polydisk, C^{r} and the polysphere. So H* lies in X, the closure of H*/K is compact in X/P, which is in turn dense in H/K.

Note that (2) and (3) are also consequences of the fact that the image of X in G/P is that of the big cell B_{+}B in the Gauss decomposition of G.

Using results on the restricted root system of the symmetric spaces H/K and H*/K, Hermann showed that the image of H*/K in $\mathfrak{m}_+$ is a generalized unit disk. In fact it is the convex set of X for which the operator norm of ad Im X is less than one.

=== Bounded symmetric domains ===
A bounded domain Ω in a complex vector space is said to be a bounded symmetric domain if for every x in Ω, there is an involutive biholomorphism σ_{x} of Ω for which x is an isolated fixed point. The Harish-Chandra embedding exhibits every Hermitian symmetric space of noncompact type H* / K as a bounded symmetric domain. The biholomorphism group of H^{*} / K is equal to its isometry group H^{*}.

Conversely every bounded symmetric domain arises in this way. Indeed, given a bounded symmetric domain Ω, the Bergman kernel defines a metric on Ω, the Bergman metric, for which every biholomorphism is an isometry. This realizes Ω as a Hermitian symmetric space of noncompact type.

=== Classification ===
The irreducible bounded symmetric domains are called Cartan domains and are classified as follows.

Type	complex dimension	geometric interpretation
I_{pq}	pq	Complex p × q matrices with operator norm less than 1
II_{n} (n > 4)	n(n − 1)/2	Complex antisymmetric n × n matrices with operator norm less than 1
III_{n} (n > 1)	n(n + 1)/2	Complex symmetric n × n matrices with operator norm less than 1
IV_{n}	n	Lie-sphere:$|z|^2< {1\over 2} (1 + (z\cdot z)^2) < 1$
V	16	2 × 2 matrices over the Cayley algebra with operator norm less than 1
VI	27	3 × 3 Hermitian matrices over the Cayley algebra with operator norm less than 1

=== Classical domains ===
In the classical cases (I–IV), the noncompact group can be realized by 2 × 2 block matrices

$$\displaystyle{g=\begin{pmatrix} A & B \\ C & D\end{pmatrix}}$$

acting by generalized Möbius transformations

$$\displaystyle{g(Z)=(AZ+B)(CZ+D)^{-1}.}$$

The polydisk theorem takes the following concrete form in the classical cases:

- Type I_{pq} (p ≤ q): for every p × q matrix M there are unitary matrices such that UMV is diagonal. In fact this follows from the polar decomposition for p × p matrices.
- Type III_{n}: for every complex symmetric n × n matrix M there is a unitary matrix U such that UMU^{t} is diagonal. This is proved by a classical argument of Siegel. Take V unitary so that V*M*MV is diagonal. Then V^{t}MV is symmetric and its real and imaginary parts commute. Since they are real symmetric matrices they can be simultaneously diagonalized by a real orthogonal matrix W. So UMU^{t} is diagonal if U = WV^{t}.
- Type II_{n}: for every complex skew symmetric n × n matrix M there is a unitary matrix such that UMU^{t} is made up of diagonal blocks
  $$\begin{pmatrix} 0 & a\\ -a & 0\end{pmatrix}$$
  and one zero if n is odd. As in Siegel's argument, this can be reduced to case where the real and imaginary parts of M commute. Any real skew-symmetric matrix can be reduced to the given canonical form by an orthogonal matrix and this can be done simultaneously for commuting matrices.
- Type IV_{n}: by a transformation in SO(n) × SO(2) any vector can be transformed so that all but the first two coordinates are non-zero.

=== Boundary components ===
The noncompact group H* acts on the complex Hermitian symmetric space H/K = G/P with only finitely many orbits. The orbit structure is described in detail in Wolf (1972). In particular the closure of the bounded domain H*/K has a unique closed orbit, which is the Shilov boundary of the domain. In general the orbits are unions of Hermitian symmetric spaces of lower dimension. The complex function theory of the domains, in particular the analogue of the Cauchy integral formulas, are described for the Cartan domains in Hua (1979). The closure of the bounded domain is the Baily–Borel compactification of H*/K.

The boundary structure can be described using Cayley transforms. For each copy of SU(2) defined by one of the noncompact roots ψ_{i}, there is a Cayley transform c_{i} which as a Möbius transformation maps the unit disk onto the upper half plane. Given a subset I of indices of the strongly orthogonal family ψ_{1}, ..., ψ_{r}, the partial Cayley transform c_{I} is defined as the product of the c_{i}'s with i in I in the product of the groups π_{i}. Let G(I) be the centralizer of this product in G and H*(I) = H* ∩ G(I). Since σ leaves H*(I) invariant, there is a corresponding Hermitian symmetric space M_{I} H*(I)/H*(I)∩K ⊂ H*/K = M . The boundary component for the subset I is the union of the K-translates of c_{I} M_{I}. When I is the set of all indices, M_{I} is a single point and the boundary component is the Shilov boundary. Moreover, M_{I} is in the closure of M_{J} if and only if I ⊇ J.

== Geometric properties ==
Every Hermitian symmetric space is a Kähler manifold. They can be defined equivalently as Riemannian symmetric spaces with a parallel complex structure with respect to which the Riemannian metric is Hermitian. The complex structure is automatically preserved by the isometry group H of the metric, and so any Hermitian symmetric space M is a homogeneous complex manifold. Some examples are complex vector spaces and complex projective spaces, with their usual Hermitian metrics and Fubini–Study metrics, and the complex unit balls with suitable metrics so that they become complete and Riemannian symmetric. The compact Hermitian symmetric spaces are projective varieties, and admit a strictly larger Lie group G of biholomorphisms with respect to which they are homogeneous: in fact, they are generalized flag manifolds, i.e., G is semisimple and the stabilizer of a point is a parabolic subgroup P of G. Among (complex) generalized flag manifolds G/P, they are characterized as those for which the nilradical of the Lie algebra of P is abelian. Thus they are contained within the family of symmetric R-spaces which conversely comprises Hermitian symmetric spaces and their real forms. The non-compact Hermitian symmetric spaces can be realized as bounded domains in complex vector spaces.

== Jordan algebras ==
Although the classical Hermitian symmetric spaces can be constructed by ad hoc methods, Jordan triple systems, or equivalently Jordan pairs, provide a uniform algebraic means of describing all the basic properties connected with a Hermitian symmetric space of compact type and its non-compact dual. This theory is described in detail in Koecher (1969) and Loos (1977) and summarized in Satake (1981). The development is in the reverse order from that using the structure theory of compact Lie groups. It starting point is the Hermitian symmetric space of noncompact type realized as a bounded symmetric domain. It can be described in terms of a Jordan pair or hermitian Jordan triple system. This Jordan algebra structure can be used to reconstruct the dual Hermitian symmetric space of compact type, including in particular all the associated Lie algebras and Lie groups.

The theory is easiest to describe when the irreducible compact Hermitian symmetric space is of tube type. In that case the space is determined by a simple real Lie algebra $\mathfrak{g}$ with negative definite Killing form. It must admit an action of SU(2) which only acts via the trivial and adjoint representation, both types occurring. Since $\mathfrak{g}$ is simple, this action is inner, so implemented by an inclusion of the Lie algebra of SU(2) in $\mathfrak{g}$. The complexification of $\mathfrak{g}$ decomposes as a direct sum of three eigenspaces for the diagonal matrices in SU(2). It is a three-graded complex Lie algebra, with the Weyl group element of SU(2) providing the involution. Each of the ±1 eigenspaces has the structure of a unital complex Jordan algebra explicitly arising as the complexification of a Euclidean Jordan algebra. It can be identified with the multiplicity space of the adjoint representation of SU(2) in $\mathfrak{g}$.

The description of irreducible Hermitian symmetric spaces of tube type starts from a simple Euclidean Jordan algebra E. It admits Jordan frames, i.e. sets of orthogonal minimal idempotents e_{1}, ..., e_{m}. Any two are related by an automorphism of E, so that the integer m is an invariant called the rank of E. Moreover, if A is the complexification of E, it has a unitary structure group. It is a subgroup of GL(A) preserving the natural complex inner product on A. Any element a in A has a polar decomposition a = u Σ α_{i} a_{i} with α_{i} ≥ 0. The spectral norm is defined by ||a|| = sup α_{i}. The associated bounded symmetric domain is just the open unit ball D in A. There is a biholomorphism between D and the tube domain T = E + iC where C is the open self-dual convex cone of elements in E of the form a = u Σ α_{i} a_{i} with u an automorphism of E and α_{i} > 0. This gives two descriptions of the Hermitian symmetric space of noncompact type. There is a natural way of using mutations of the Jordan algebra A to compactify the space A. The compactification X is a complex manifold and the finite-dimensional Lie algebra $\mathfrak{g}$ of holomorphic vector fields on X can be determined explicitly. One parameter groups of biholomorphisms can be defined such that the corresponding holomorphic vector fields span $\mathfrak{g}$. This includes the group of all complex Möbius transformations corresponding to matrices in SL(2,C). The subgroup SU(1,1) leaves invariant the unit ball and its closure. The subgroup SL(2,R) leaves invariant the tube domain and its closure. The usual Cayley transform and its inverse, mapping the unit disk in C to the upper half plane, establishes analogous maps between D and T. The polydisk corresponds to the real and complex Jordan subalgebras generated by a fixed Jordan frame. It admits a transitive action of SU(2)^{m} and this action extends to X. The group G generated by the one-parameter groups of biholomorphisms acts faithfully on $\mathfrak{g}$. The subgroup generated by the identity component K of the unitary structure group and the operators in SU(2)^{m}. It defines a compact Lie group H which acts transitively on X. Thus H / K is the corresponding Hermitian symmetric space of compact type. The group G can be identified with the complexification of H. The subgroup H* leaving D invariant is a noncompact real form of G. It acts transitively on D so that H* / K is the dual Hermitian symmetric space of noncompact type. The inclusions D ⊂ A ⊂ X reproduce the Borel and Harish-Chandra embeddings. The classification of Hermitian symmetric spaces of tube type reduces to that of simple Euclidean Jordan algebras. These were classified by Jordan, von Neumann & Wigner (1934) in terms of Euclidean Hurwitz algebras, a special type of composition algebra.

In general a Hermitian symmetric space gives rise to a 3-graded Lie algebra with a period 2 conjugate linear automorphism switching the parts of degree ±1 and preserving the degree 0 part. This gives rise to the structure of a Jordan pair or hermitian Jordan triple system, to which Loos (1977) extended the theory of Jordan algebras. All irreducible Hermitian symmetric spaces can be constructed uniformly within this framework. Koecher (1969) constructed the irreducible Hermitian symmetric space of non-tube type from a simple Euclidean Jordan algebra together with a period 2 automorphism. The −1 eigenspace of the automorphism has the structure of a Jordan pair, which can be deduced from that of the larger Jordan algebra. In the non-tube type case corresponding to a Siegel domain of type II, there is no distinguished subgroup of real or complex Möbius transformations. For irreducible Hermitian symmetric spaces, tube type is characterized by the real dimension of the Shilov boundary S being equal to the complex dimension of D.

== See also ==
- Invariant convex cone
