= Borel–de Siebenthal theory =

In mathematics, Borel–de Siebenthal theory describes the closed connected subgroups of a compact Lie group that have maximal rank, i.e. contain a maximal torus. It is named after the Swiss mathematicians Armand Borel and Jean de Siebenthal who developed the theory in 1949. Each such subgroup is the identity component of the centralizer of its center. They can be described recursively in terms of the associated root system of the group. The subgroups for which the corresponding homogeneous space has an invariant complex structure correspond to parabolic subgroups in the complexification of the compact Lie group, a reductive algebraic group.

== Connected subgroups of maximal rank ==
Let G be connected compact Lie group with maximal torus T. Hopf showed that the centralizer of a torus S ⊆ T is a connected closed subgroup containing T, so of maximal rank. Indeed, if x is in C_{G}(S), there is a maximal torus containing both S and x and it is contained in C_{G}(S).

Borel and de Siebenthal proved that the connected closed subgroups of maximal rank are precisely the identity components of the centralizers of their centers.

Their result relies on a fact from representation theory. The weights of an irreducible representation of a connected compact semisimple group K with highest weight λ can be easily described (without their multiplicities): they are precisely the saturation under the Weyl group of the dominant weights obtained by subtracting off a sum of simple roots from λ. In particular, if the irreducible representation is trivial on the center of K (a finite abelian group), 0 is a weight.

To prove the characterization of Borel and de Siebenthal, let H be a closed connected subgroup of G containing T with center Z. The identity component L of C_{G}(Z) contains H. If it were strictly larger, the restriction of the adjoint representation of L to H would be trivial on Z. Any irreducible summand, orthogonal to the Lie algebra of H, would provide non-zero weight zero vectors for T / Z ⊆ H / Z, contradicting the maximality of the torus T / Z in L / Z.

== Maximal connected subgroups of maximal rank ==
Borel and de Siebenthal classified the maximal closed connected subgroups of maximal rank of a connected compact Lie group.

The general classification of connected closed subgroups of maximal rank can be reduced to this case, because any connected subgroup of maximal rank is contained in a finite chain of such subgroups, each maximal in the next one. Maximal subgroups are the identity components of any element of their center not belonging to the center of the whole group.

The problem of determining the maximal connected subgroups of maximal rank can be further reduced to the case where the compact Lie group is simple. In fact the Lie algebra $\mathfrak{g}$ of a connected compact Lie group G splits as a direct sum of the ideals

$$\displaystyle{\mathfrak{g}=\mathfrak{z} \oplus \mathfrak{g}_1\oplus \cdots \oplus \mathfrak{g}_m,}$$

where $\mathfrak{z}$ is the center and the other factors $\mathfrak{g}_i$ are simple. If T is a maximal torus, its Lie algebra $\mathfrak{t}$ has a corresponding splitting

$$\displaystyle{\mathfrak{t}=\mathfrak{z} \oplus \mathfrak{t}_1\oplus \cdots \oplus \mathfrak{t}_m,}$$

where $\mathfrak{t}_i$ is maximal abelian in $\mathfrak{g}_i$. If H is a closed connected of G containing T with Lie algebra $\mathfrak{h}$, the complexification of $\mathfrak{h}$ is the direct sum of the complexification of $\mathfrak{t}$ and a number of one-dimensional weight spaces, each of which lies in the complexification of a factor $\mathfrak{g}_i$. Thus if

$$\displaystyle{\mathfrak{h}_i=\mathfrak{h}\cap\mathfrak{g}_i,}$$

then

$$\displaystyle{\mathfrak{h}=\mathfrak{z} \oplus \mathfrak{h}_1\oplus\cdots \oplus \mathfrak{h}_m.}$$

If H is maximal, all but one of the $\mathfrak{h}_i$'s coincide with $\mathfrak{g}_i$ and the remaining one is maximal and of maximal rank. For that factor, the closed connected subgroup of the corresponding simply connected simple compact Lie group is maximal and of maximal rank.

Let G be a connected simply connected compact simple Lie group with maximal torus T. Let $\mathfrak{g}$ be the Lie algebra of G and $\mathfrak{t}$ that of T. Let Δ be the corresponding root system. Choose a set of positive roots and corresponding simple roots α_{1}, ..., α_{n}. Let α_{0} the highest root in $\mathfrak{g}_{\mathbf{C}}$ and write

$$\displaystyle{\alpha_0=m_1 \alpha_1 + \cdots + m_n\alpha_n}$$

with m_{i} ≥ 1. (The number of m_{i} equal to 1 is equal to |Z| – 1, where Z is the center of G.)

The Weyl alcove is defined by

$$\displaystyle{A=\{T\in\mathfrak{t}:\, \alpha_1(T)\ge 0, \dots,\alpha_n(T)\ge 0, \alpha_0(T)\le 1\}.}$$

Élie Cartan showed that it is a fundamental domain for the affine Weyl group. If G_{1} = G / Z and T_{1} = T / Z, it follows that the exponential mapping from $\mathfrak{g}$ to G_{1} carries 2πA onto T_{1}.

The Weyl alcove A is a simplex with vertices at

$$\displaystyle{v_0=0,\,\, v_i=m_i^{-1} X_i,}$$

where α_{i}(X_{j}) = δ_{ij}.

The main result of Borel and de Siebenthal is as follows.

THEOREM. The maximal connected subgroups of maximal rank in G_{1} up to conjugacy have the form
• C_{G_{1}} (X_{i}) for m_{i} = 1
• C_{G_{1}}(v_{i}) for m_{i} a prime.

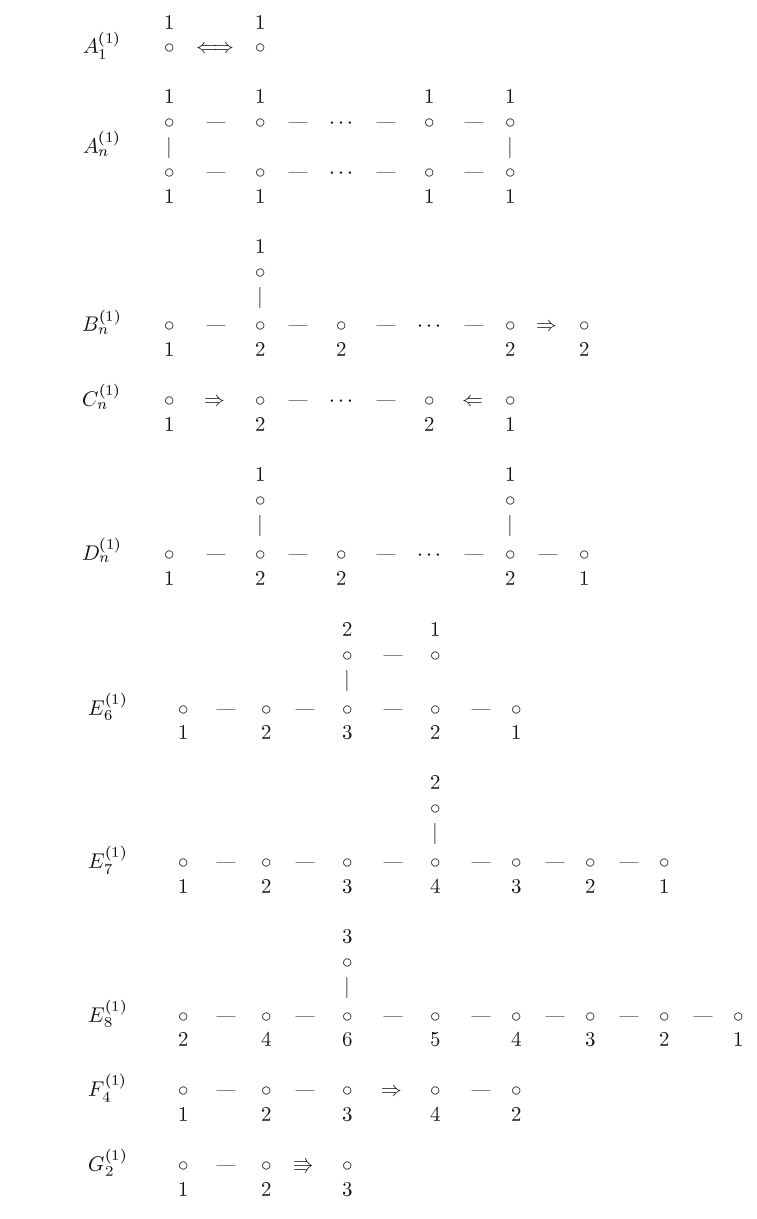
Extended Dynkin diagrams for the simple complex Lie algebras

The structure of the corresponding subgroup H_{1} can be described in both cases. It is semisimple in the second case with a system of simple roots obtained by replacing α_{i} by −α_{0}. In the first case it is the direct product of the circle group generated by X_{i} and a semisimple compact group with a system of simple roots obtained by omitting α_{i}.

This result can be rephrased in terms of the extended Dynkin diagram of $\mathfrak{g}$ which adds an extra node for the highest root as well as the labels m_{i}. The maximal subalgebras $\mathfrak{h}$ of maximal rank are either non-semisimple or semisimple. The non-semisimple ones are obtained by deleting two nodes from the extended diagram with coefficient one. The corresponding unlabelled diagram gives the Dynkin diagram semisimple part of $\mathfrak{h}$, the other part being a one-dimensional factor. The Dynkin diagrams for the semisimple ones are obtained by removing one node with coefficient a prime. This leads to the following possibilities:

- A_{n}: A_{p} × A _{n − p − 1} × T (non-semisimple)
- B_{n}: D_{n} or B_{p} × D_{n − p} (semisimple), B_{n − 1} × T (non-semisimple)
- C_{n}: C_{p} × C_{n − p} (SS), A_{n - 1} × T (NSS)
- D_{n}: D_{p} × D_{n - p} (SS), D_{n - 1} × T, A_{n-1} × T (NSS)
- E_{6}: A_{1} × A_{5}, A_{2} × A_{2} × A_{2} (SS), D_{5} × T (NSS)
- E_{7}: A_{1} × D_{6}, A_{2} × A_{5}, A_{7} (SS), E_{6} × T (NSS)
- E_{8}: D_{8}, A_{8}, A_{4} × A_{4}, E_{6} × A_{2}, E_{7} × A_{1} (SS)
- F_{4}: B_{4}, A_{2} × A_{2}, A_{1} × C_{3} (SS)
- G_{2}: A_{2}, A_{1} × A_{1} (SS)

All the corresponding homogeneous spaces are symmetric, since the subalgebra is the fixed point algebra of an inner automorphism of period 2, apart from G_{2}/A_{2}, F_{4}/A_{2}×A_{2}, E_{6}/A_{2}×A_{2}×A_{2}, E_{7}/A_{2}×A_{5} and all the E_{8} spaces other than E_{8}/D_{8} and E_{8}/E_{7}×A_{1}. In all these exceptional cases the subalgebra is the fixed point algebra of an inner automorphism of period 3, except for E_{8}/A_{4}×A_{4} where the automorphism has period 5.

To prove the theorem, note that H_{1} is the identity component of the centralizer of an element exp T with T in 2π A. Stabilizers increase in moving from a subsimplex to an edge or vertex, so T either lies on an edge or is a vertex. If it lies on an edge than that edge connects 0 to a vertex v_{i} with m_{i} = 1, which is the first case. If T is a vertex v_{i} and m_{i} has a non-trivial factor m, then mT has a larger stabilizer than T, contradicting maximality. So m_{i} must be prime. Maximality can be checked directly using the fact that an intermediate subgroup K would have the same form, so that its center would be either (a) T or (b) an element of prime order. If the center of H_{1} is 'T, each simple root with m_{i} prime is already a root of K, so (b) is not possible; and if (a) holds, α_{i} is the only root that could be omitted with m_{j} = 1, so K = H_{1}. If the center of H_{1} is of prime order, α_{j} is a root of K for m_{j} = 1, so that (a) is not possible; if (b) holds, then the only possible omitted simple root is α_{i}, so that K = H_{1}.

== Closed subsystems of roots ==
A subset Δ_{1} ⊂ Δ is called a closed subsystem if whenever α and β lie in Δ_{1} with α + β in Δ, then α + β lies in Δ_{1}. Two subsystems Δ_{1} and Δ_{2} are said to be equivalent if σ( Δ_{1}) = Δ_{2} for some σ in W = N_{G}(T) / T, the Weyl group. Thus for a closed subsystem

$$\displaystyle{\mathfrak{t}_{\mathbf{C}} \oplus \bigoplus_{\alpha\in \Delta_1} \mathfrak{g}_\alpha}$$

is a subalgebra of $\mathfrak{g}_{\mathbf{C}}$ containing $\mathfrak{t}_{\mathbf{C}}$; and conversely any such subalgebra gives rise to a closed subsystem. Borel and de Siebenthal classified the maximal closed subsystems up to equivalence.

THEOREM. Up to equivalence the maximal closed root subsystems are given by m_{i} = 1 with simple roots all α_{j} with j ≠ i or by m_{i} > 1 prime with simple roots −α_{0} and all α_{j} with j ≠ i.

This result is a consequence of the Borel–de Siebenthal theorem for maximal connected subgroups of maximal rank. It can also be proved directly within the theory of root systems and reflection groups.

== Applications to symmetric spaces of compact type ==
Let G be a connected compact semisimple Lie group, σ an automorphism of G of period 2 and G^{σ} the fixed point subgroup of σ. Let K be a closed subgroup of G lying between G^{σ} and its identity component. The compact homogeneous space G / K is called a symmetric space of compact type. The Lie algebra $\mathfrak{g}$ admits a decomposition

$$\displaystyle{\mathfrak{g}=\mathfrak{k}\oplus\mathfrak{p},}$$

where $\mathfrak{k}$, the Lie algebra of K, is the +1 eigenspace of σ and $\mathfrak{p}$ the –1 eigenspace. If $\mathfrak{k}$ contains no simple summand of $\mathfrak{g}$, the pair ($\mathfrak{g}$, σ) is called an orthogonal symmetric Lie algebra of compact type.

Any inner product on $\mathfrak{g}$, invariant under the adjoint representation and σ, induces a Riemannian structure on G / K, with G acting by isometries. Under such an inner product, $\mathfrak{k}$ and $\mathfrak{p}$ are orthogonal. G / K is then a Riemannian symmetric space of compact type.

The symmetric space or the pair ($\mathfrak{g}$, σ) is said to be irreducible if the adjoint action of $\mathfrak{k}$ (or equivalently the identity component of G^{σ} or K) is irreducible on $\mathfrak{p}$. This is equivalent to the maximality of $\mathfrak{k}$ as a subalgebra.

In fact there is a one-one correspondence between intermediate subalgebras $\mathfrak{h}$ and K-invariant subspaces $\mathfrak{p}_1$ of $\mathfrak{p}$ given by

$$\displaystyle{\mathfrak{h}=\mathfrak{k}\oplus \mathfrak{p}_1,\,\,\,\ \mathfrak{p}_1=\mathfrak{h}\cap \mathfrak{p}.}$$

Any orthogonal symmetric algebra ($\mathfrak{g}$, σ) can be decomposed as an (orthogonal) direct sum of irreducible orthogonal symmetric algebras.

In fact $\mathfrak{g}$ can be written as a direct sum of simple algebras

$$\displaystyle{\mathfrak{g}=\oplus_{i=1}^N \mathfrak{g}_i,}$$

which are permuted by the automorphism σ. If σ leaves an algebra $\mathfrak{g}_1$ invariant, its eigenspace decomposition coincides with its intersections with $\mathfrak{k}$ and $\mathfrak{p}$. So the restriction of σ to $\mathfrak{g}_1$ is irreducible. If σ interchanges two simple summands, the corresponding pair is isomorphic to a diagonal inclusion of K in K × K, with K simple, so is also irreducible. The involution σ just swaps the two factors σ(x,y)=(y,x).

This decomposition of an orthogonal symmetric algebra yields a direct product decomposition of the corresponding compact symmetric space G / K when G is simply connected. In this case the fixed point subgroup G^{σ} is automatically connected (this is no longer true, even for inner involutions, if G is not simply connected). For simply connected G, the symmetric space G / K is the direct product of the two kinds of symmetric spaces G_{i} / K_{i} or H × H / H. Non-simply connected symmetric space of compact type arise as quotients of the simply connected space G / K by finite abelian groups. In fact if

$$\displaystyle{G/K=G_1/K_1\times \cdots\times G_s/K_s,}$$

let

$$\displaystyle{\Gamma_i=Z(G_i)/Z(G_i)\cap K_i}$$

and let Δ_{i} be the subgroup of Γ_{i} fixed by all automorphisms of G_{i} preserving K_{i} (i.e. automorphisms of the orthogonal symmetric Lie algebra). Then

$$\displaystyle{\Delta=\Delta_1\times \cdots\times\Delta_s}$$

is a finite abelian group acting freely on G / K. The non-simply connected symmetric spaces arise as quotients by subgroups of Δ. The subgroup can be identified with the fundamental group, which is thus a finite abelian group.

The classification of compact symmetric spaces or pairs ($\mathfrak{g}$, σ) thus reduces to the case where G is a connected simple compact Lie group. There are two possibilities: either the automorphism σ is inner, in which case K has maximal rank and the theory of Borel and de Siebenthal applies; or the automorphism σ is outer, so that, because σ preserves a maximal torus, the rank of K is less than the rank of G and σ corresponds to an automorphism of the Dynkin diagram modulo inner automorphisms. Wolf (2010) determines directly all possible σ in the latter case: they correspond to the symmetric spaces SU(n)/SO(n), SU(2n)/Sp(n), SO(a+b)/SO(a)×SO(b) (a and b odd), E_{6}/F_{4} and E_{6}/C_{4}.

Victor Kac noticed that all finite order automorphisms of a simple Lie algebra can be determined using the corresponding affine Lie algebra: that classification, which leads to an alternative method of classifying pairs ($\mathfrak{g}$, σ), is described in Helgason (1978).

== Applications to hermitian symmetric spaces of compact type ==
The equal rank case with K non-semisimple corresponds exactly to the Hermitian symmetric spaces G / K of compact type.

In fact the symmetric space has an almost complex structure preserving the Riemannian metric if and only if there is a linear map J with J^{2} = −I on $\mathfrak{p}$ which preserves the inner product and commutes with the action of K. In this case J lies in $\mathfrak{k}$ and exp Jt forms a one-parameter group in the center of K. This follows because if A, B, C, D lie in $\mathfrak{p}$, then by the invariance of the inner product on $\mathfrak{g}$

$$\displaystyle{([[A,B],C],D)=([A,B],[C,D])=([[C,D],B],A).}$$

Replacing A and B by JA and JB, it follows that

$$\displaystyle{[JA,JB] = [A,B].}$$

Define a linear map δ on $\mathfrak{g}$ by extending J to be 0 on $\mathfrak{k}$. The last relation shows that δ is a derivation of $\mathfrak{g}$. Since $\mathfrak{g}$ is semisimple, δ must be an inner derivation, so that

$$\delta(X)=[T + A,X],$$

with T in $\mathfrak{k}$ and A in $\mathfrak{p}$. Taking X in $\mathfrak{k}$, it follows that A = 0 and T lies in the center of $\mathfrak{k}$ and hence that K is non-semisimple.

If on the other hand G / K is irreducible with K non-semisimple, the compact group G must be simple and K of maximal rank. From the theorem of Borel and de Siebenthal, the involution σ is inner and K is the centralizer of a torus S. It follows that G / K is simply connected and there is a parabolic subgroup P in the complexification G_{C} of G such that G / K = G_{C} / P. In particular there is a complex structure on G / K and the action of G is holomorphic.

In general any compact hermitian symmetric space is simply connected and can be written as a direct product of irreducible hermitian symmetric spaces G_{i} / K_{i} with G_{i} simple. The irreducible ones are exactly the non-semisimple cases described above.
