= JScheme =

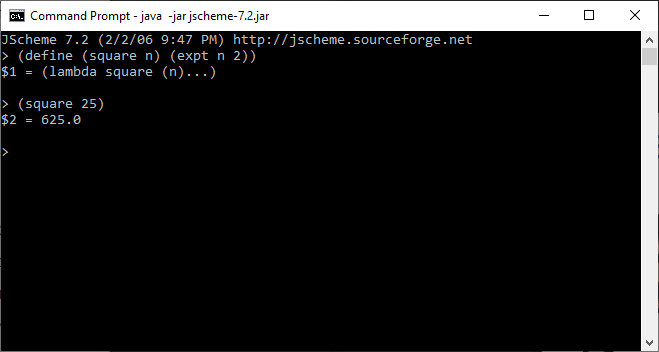
- JScheme 7.2 running on a Windows 10 system
- Stable release: 7.2 / February 4, 2006; 19 years ago
- Written in: Scheme
- Operating system: Cross-platform
- Platform: Java Virtual Machine
- Type: Scheme programming language interpreter
- License: zlib License
- Website: jscheme.sourceforge.net/jscheme/main.html

JScheme is an implementation of the Scheme programming language, created by Kenneth R. Anderson, Timothy J. Hickey and Peter Norvig, which is almost compliant with the R4RS Scheme standard and which has an interface to Java.

Distributed under the licence of zlib/libpng, JScheme is free software.

== See also ==
- List of JVM languages
