= Armand Borel =

Swiss mathematician (1923–2003)

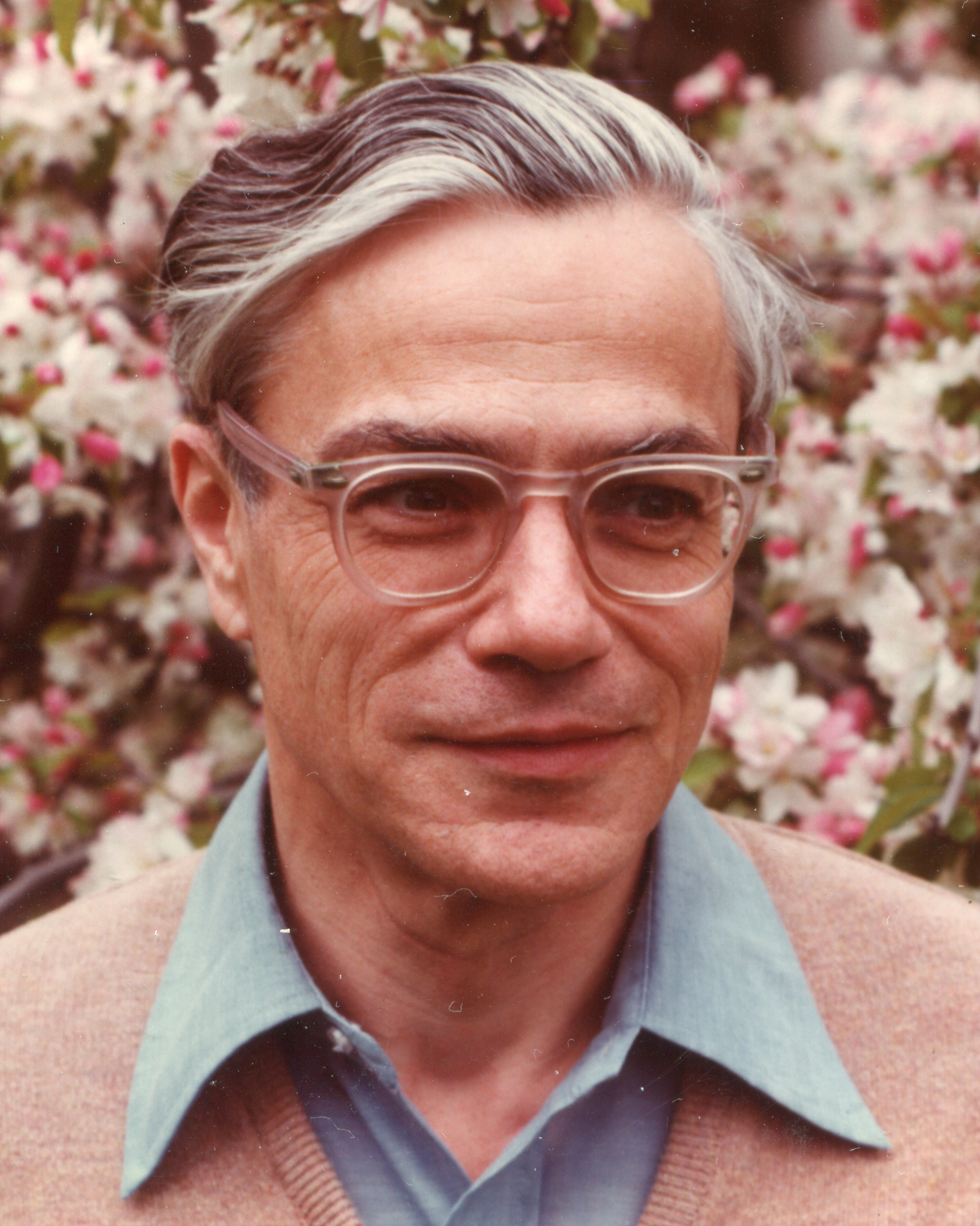
- Armand Borel in Berkeley, 1975.
- Born: 21 May 1923; La Chaux-de-Fonds, Switzerland
- Died: 11 August 2003 (aged 80); Princeton, New Jersey, United States
- Education: ETH Zürich
- Awards: Leroy P. Steele Prize (1991)
- Scientific career
- Fields: Mathematics
- Workplaces: Institute for Advanced Study
- Doctoral advisor: Jean Leray

Armand Borel (21 May 1923 – 11 August 2003) was a Swiss mathematician, born in La Chaux-de-Fonds, and was a permanent professor at the Institute for Advanced Study in Princeton, New Jersey, United States from 1957 to 1993. He worked in algebraic topology, in the theory of Lie groups, and was one of the creators of the contemporary theory of linear algebraic groups.

== Biography ==
He studied at the ETH Zürich, where he came under the influence of the topologist Heinz Hopf and Lie-group theorist Eduard Stiefel. He was in Paris from 1949: he applied the Leray spectral sequence to the topology of Lie groups and their classifying spaces, under the influence of Jean Leray and Henri Cartan. With Hirzebruch, he significantly developed the theory of characteristic classes in the early 1950s.

He collaborated with Jacques Tits in fundamental work on algebraic groups, and with Harish-Chandra on their arithmetic subgroups. In an algebraic group G a Borel subgroup H is one minimal with respect to the property that the homogeneous space G/H is a projective variety. For example, if G is GL_{n} then we can take H to be the subgroup of upper triangular matrices. In this case it turns out that H is a maximal solvable subgroup, and that the parabolic subgroups P between H and G have a combinatorial structure (in this case the homogeneous spaces G/P are the various flag manifolds). Both those aspects generalize, and play a central role in the theory.

The Borel−Moore homology theory applies to general locally compact spaces, and is closely related to sheaf theory.

He published a number of books, including a work on the history of Lie groups. In 1978 he received the Brouwer Medal and in 1992 he was awarded the Balzan Prize "For his fundamental contributions to the theory of Lie groups, algebraic groups and arithmetic groups, and for his indefatigable action in favour of high quality in mathematical research and the propagation of new ideas" (motivation of the Balzan General Prize Committee). He was a member of the American Academy of Arts and Sciences, the United States National Academy of Sciences, and the American Philosophical Society.

He died in Princeton. He used to answer the question of whether he was related to Émile Borel alternately by saying he was a nephew, and no relation.

== Famous quotations ==
"I feel that what mathematics needs least are pundits who issue prescriptions or guidelines for presumably less enlightened mortals." (Oeuvres IV, p. 452)

== See also ==
- Borel–Weil–Bott theorem
- Borel cohomology
- Borel conjecture
- Borel construction
- Borel subgroup
- Borel subalgebra
- Borel fixed-point theorem
- Borel's theorem
- Borel–de Siebenthal theory
- Borel–Moore homology
- Baily–Borel compactification
- Linear algebraic group
- Spin structure

== Publications ==
- Borel, Armand (1960), Seminar on transformation groups, With contributions by G. Bredon, E. E. Floyd, D. Montgomery, R. Palais. Annals of Mathematics Studies, No. 46, Princeton University Press, MR 0116341
- Borel, Armand (1964) [1957], Cohomologie des espaces localement compacts d'après J. Leray. Exposés faits au séminaire de Topologie algébrique de l'École Polytechnique Fédérale, printemps 1951, Lecture Notes in Mathematics (in French), vol. 2 (3rd ed.), Berlin, New York: Springer-Verlag, doi:10.1007/BFb0097851, MR 0174045 ISBN 978-3-540-03179-6.
- Borel, Armand (1967) [1954], Halpern, Edward (ed.), Topics in the Homology Theory of Fibre Bundles, Lecture Notes in Mathematics, vol. 36, Berlin, New York: Springer-Verlag, doi:10.1007/BFb0096867, ISBN 978-3-540-03907-5, MR 0221507
- Borel, Armand (1969), Introduction aux groupes arithmétiques, Publications de l'Institut de Mathématique de l'Université de Strasbourg, XV. Actualités Scientifiques et Industrielles, No. 1341 (in French), Paris: Hermann, MR 0244260
- Borel, Armand (1972), Représentations de Groupes Localement Compacts, Lecture Notes in Mathematics, vol. 276, Berlin, New York: Springer-Verlag, doi:10.1007/BFb0058407, ISBN 978-3-540-05926-4, MR 0414779
- Borel, Armand (1991) [1969], Linear algebraic groups, Graduate Texts in Mathematics, vol. 126 (2nd ed.), Berlin, New York: Springer-Verlag, ISBN 978-0-387-97370-8, MR 1102012
- Borel, Armand (2008) [1984], Intersection cohomology, Modern Birkhäuser Classics, Boston, MA: Birkhäuser Boston, ISBN 978-0-8176-4764-3, MR 0788171
- Borel, Armand; Grivel, Pierre-Paul; Kaup, Burchard; Haefliger, André; Malgrange, Bernard; Ehlers, Fritz (1987), Algebraic D-modules, Perspectives in Mathematics, vol. 2, Boston, MA: Academic Press, ISBN 978-0-12-117740-9, MR 0882000
- Borel, Armand (1997), Automorphic forms on SL_{2}(R), Cambridge Tracts in Mathematics, vol. 130, Cambridge University Press, ISBN 978-0-521-58049-6, MR 1482800
- Borel, Armand (1998), Semisimple groups and Riemannian symmetric spaces, Texts and Readings in Mathematics, vol. 16, New Delhi: Hindustan Book Agency, ISBN 978-81-85931-18-0, MR 1661166
- Borel, Armand; Wallach, Nolan (2000) [1980], Continuous cohomology, discrete subgroups, and representations of reductive groups, Mathematical Surveys and Monographs, vol. 67 (2nd ed.), Providence, R.I.: American Mathematical Society, ISBN 978-0-8218-0851-1, MR 1721403
- Borel, Armand (2001), Essays in the History of Lie Groups and Algebraic Groups, Providence, R.I.: American Mathematical Society, ISBN 978-0-8218-0288-5, MR 1847105
- Borel, Armand (1983), Œuvres: collected papers, vol. I, II, III, Berlin, New York: Springer-Verlag, ISBN 978-3-540-12126-8, MR 0725852
- Borel, Armand (2001), Œuvres: collected papers, vol. IV, Berlin, New York: Springer-Verlag, ISBN 978-3-540-67640-9, MR 1829820
- Borel, Armand; Ji, Lizhen (2006), Compactifications of symmetric and locally symmetric spaces, Mathematics: Theory & Applications, Boston, MA: Birkhäuser Boston, doi:10.1007/0-8176-4466-0, ISBN 978-0-8176-3247-2, MR 2189882

== Sources ==
- "Special issue dedicated to the memory of Professor Armand Borel, 1923–2003", Asian Journal of Mathematics, 8 (4), 2004
- Arthur, James; Bombieri, Enrico; Chandrasekharan, Komaravolu; Hirzebruch, Friedrich; Prasad, Gopal; Serre, Jean-Pierre; Springer, Tonny A.; Tits, Jacques (2004), "Armand Borel (1923--2003)", Notices of the American Mathematical Society, 51 (5): 498–524, ISSN 0002-9920, MR 2046057
- Haefliger, André (2004), "Armand Borel (1923--2003)", Gazette des Mathématiciens (102): 7–14, ISSN 0224-8999, MR 2108056
- O'Connor, John J.; Robertson, Edmund F., "Armand Borel", MacTutor History of Mathematics Archive, University of St Andrews
- Springer, Tonny A. (2007), "Armand Borel's work in the theory of linear algebraic groups", Algebraic groups and homogeneous spaces, Tata Inst. Fund. Res. Stud. Math., Mumbai: Tata Inst. Fund. Res., pp. 1–11, MR 2348899
